= HSO =

HSO may refer to:

== Orchestras ==
- Harrisburg Symphony Orchestra, Pennsylvania, United States
- Hartford Symphony Orchestra, Connecticut, United States
- Helena Symphony Orchestra, Montana, United States
- Hereford String Orchestra, England
- Hillsboro Symphony Orchestra, Oregon, United States
- Hollywood Symphony Orchestra, California, United States
- Houston Symphony, Texas, United States
- Huntsville Symphony Orchestra, Alabama, United States

== Other uses ==
- Ford HSO engine
- Hamburg State Opera
- Health Sciences Online
- Healthscope, an Australian hospital operator
- Herschel Space Observatory
- Hungarian Space Office
