= Gigablast =

Free and open-source web search engine

- Home page as of January 2019
- Website type: Search engine
- Available in: English
- Founded: 2000; 26 years ago
- Dissolved: April 2023; 3 years ago
- Headquarters: Albuquerque, New Mexico, United States
- Owners: Gigablast, Inc.
- Creator: Matt Wells
- Registration: Optional
- Launched: 2002; 24 years ago
- Current status: Offline
- Written in: C/C++

gb
- Developer: Matt Wells
- Final release: 1.20-1 (x64, i386)
- Written in: C/C++
- Operating system: Linux
- Type: search engine
- License: Apache License 2.0
- Website: www.gigablast.com
- Repository: github.com/gigablast

Gigablast was an American free and open-source web search engine and directory. Founded in 2000, it was an independent engine and web crawler, developed and maintained by Matt Wells, a former Infoseek employee and New Mexico Tech graduate. During early April 2023, the website went offline without warning and without any official statement.

The open-source search engine source code is written in the programming languages C and C++. It was released as open-source software under the Apache License version 2, in July 2013. In 2015, Gigablast claimed to have indexed over 12 billion web pages.

The Gigablast engine provided search results to other companies at various times, including Ixquick, Clusty, Zuula, Snap, Blingo, and Internet Archive.

== Background ==
Matt Wells worked for the Infoseek search engine until he left in 1999, to start working on what would become Gigablast, coding everything from scratch in C++. It was originally designed to index up to 200 billion web pages. Gigablast went into beta release on July 21, 2002.

== Features ==
Gigablast supported various specialized searches and Boolean algebra operators. It also supported a related-concept feature called Giga Bits and a blog-search feature.

A feature called Gigabits provided relevant information in addition to what the user was searching for.

Gigablast also claimed to be, as of 2010, the "leading" clean energy search engine with 90 percent of its power coming from wind energy.

== Acquisition ==
In 2013, it was reported that Yippy had agreed to acquire Gigablast Inc. However, later on, Gigablast author Matt Wells said that no acquisition took place and that Gigablast remained independent.

== Critical reception ==
In 2003, The New York Times columnist Lee Dembart stated that "Gigablast has its adherents", but opined that Google is "head and shoulders" above it, and adds that Google's search results are more complete. In 2016, a Lifewire reviewer felt that Gigablast is easy to use and liked the Gigabits feature.

== See also ==
- List of search engines
- Search engine
- Comparison of search engines
