= Non-communicable disease =

Medical conditions that cannot transmit from one individual to another

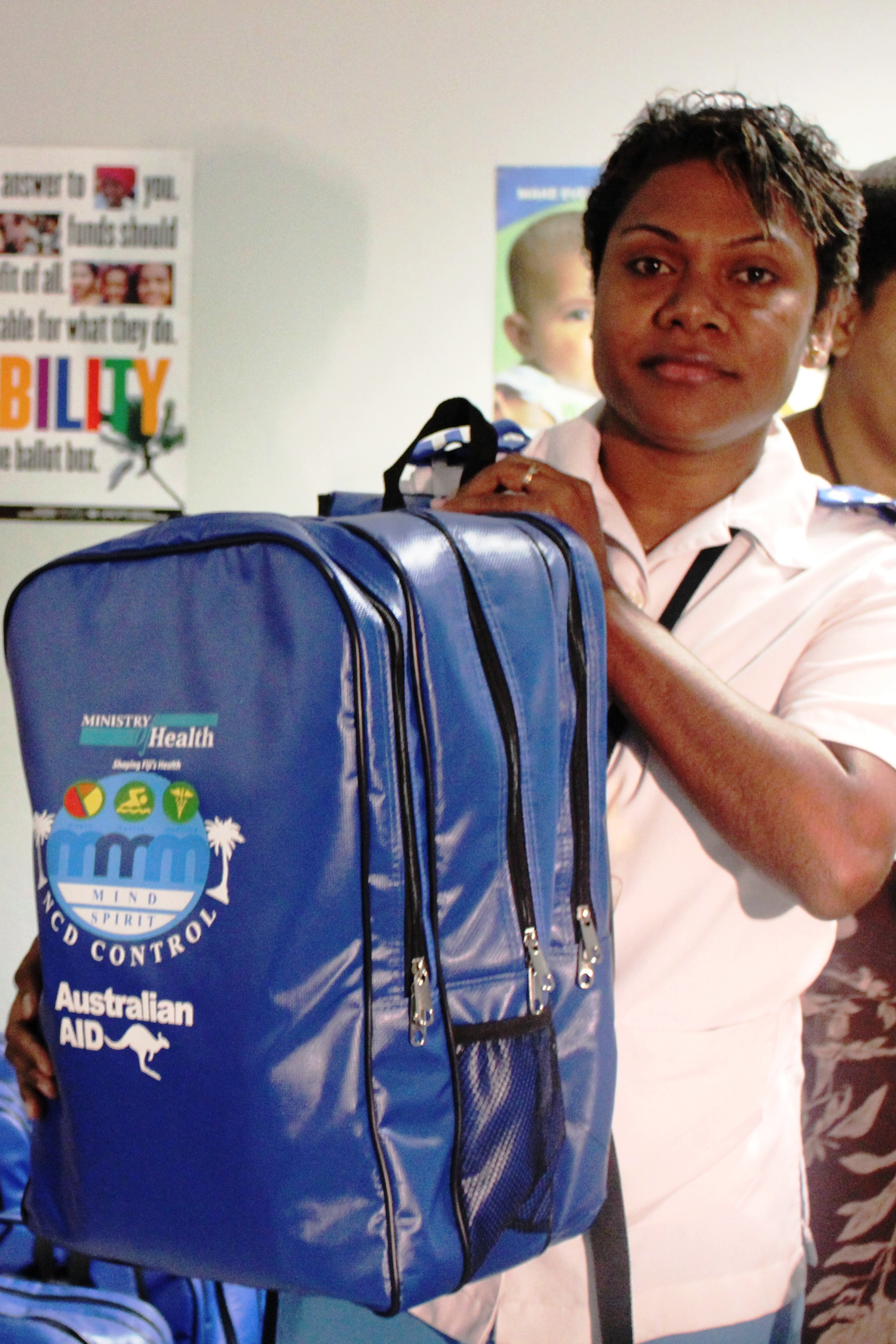
- A nurse with a non-communicable diseases kit, Fiji, 2012

A non-communicable disease (NCD) is a disease that is not transmissible directly from one person to another. NCDs include Parkinson's disease, autoimmune diseases, strokes, heart diseases, cancers, diabetes, chronic kidney disease, osteoarthritis, osteoporosis, Alzheimer's disease, cataracts, and others. NCDs may be chronic or acute. Most are non-infectious, although there are some non-communicable infectious diseases, such as parasitic diseases in which the parasite's life cycle does not include direct host-to-host transmission.

The four main NCDs that are the leading causes of death globally are cardiovascular disease, cancer, chronic respiratory diseases, and diabetes. NCDs account for seven out of the ten leading causes of death worldwide. Figures given for 2021 are at least 43 million deaths due to NCDs, equivalent to 75% of non-pandemic-related deaths globally. Of these, at least 19 million were due to cardiovascular diseases; 10 million to cancers; 4 million to chronic respiratory diseases; and over 2 million to diabetes, including kidney disease deaths caused by diabetes.

Risk factors such as a person's background, lifestyle and environment increase the likelihood of certain NCDs. Every year, at least 5 million people die because of tobacco use and about 2.8 million die from being overweight. High cholesterol accounts for roughly 2.6 million deaths and 7.5 million die because of high blood pressure.

== Risk factors ==
Risk factors such as a person's background; lifestyle and environment are known to increase the likelihood of certain non-communicable diseases. They include age, gender, genetics, exposure to air pollution, and behaviors such as smoking, unhealthy diet and physical inactivity which can lead to hypertension and obesity, in turn leading to increased risk of many NCDs. Most NCDs are considered preventable because they are caused by modifiable risk factors.

The WHO's World Health Report 2002 identified five important risk factors for non-communicable disease in the top ten leading risks to health. These are raised blood pressure, raised cholesterol, tobacco use, alcohol consumption, and being overweight. The other factors associated with higher risk of NCDs include a person's economic and social conditions, also known as the social determinants of health.

It has been estimated that if the primary risk factors were eliminated, 80% of the cases of heart disease, stroke and type 2 diabetes and 40% of cancers could be prevented. Interventions targeting the main risk factors could have a significant impact on reducing the burden of disease worldwide. Efforts focused on better diet and increased physical activity have been shown to control the prevalence of NCDs .

== Environmental diseases ==
NCDs include many environmental diseases covering a broad category of avoidable and unavoidable human health conditions caused by external factors, such as sunlight, nutrition, pollution, and lifestyle choices. The diseases of affluence are non-infectious diseases with environmental causes. Examples include:

- Many types of cardiovascular disease (CVD)
- Chronic respiratory diseases (such as asthma and chronic obstructive pulmonary disease
- Diabetes mellitus type 2
- Noise-induced hearing loss
- Lower back pain caused by too little exercise
- Malnutrition caused by too little food, or eating the wrong kinds of food (e.g. scurvy from lack of Vitamin C)
- Skin cancer caused by radiation from the sun
- Obesity

=== Inherited diseases ===
Genetic disorders are caused by errors in genetic information that produce diseases in the affected people. The origin of these genetic errors can be:

- Spontaneous errors or mutations to the genome:

- A change in chromosome numbers, such as Down syndrome.
- A defect in a gene caused by mutation, such as Cystic fibrosis.
- An increase in the amount of genetic information, such as Chimerism or Heterochromia.

Cystic fibrosis is an example of an inherited disease that is caused by a mutation on a gene. The faulty gene impairs the normal movement of sodium chloride in and out of cells, which causes the mucus-secreting organs to produce abnormally thick mucus. The gene is recessive, meaning that a person must have two copies of the faulty gene for them to develop the disease. Cystic fibrosis affects the respiratory, digestive and reproductive systems, as well as the sweat glands. The mucus secreted is very thick and blocks passageways in the lungs and digestive tracts. This mucus causes problems with breathing and with the digestion and absorption of nutrients.

- Inherited genetic errors from parents:

- Dominant genetic diseases, such as Huntingtons, require the inheritance of one erroneous gene to be expressed.
- Recessive genetic diseases require the inheritance of erroneous genes to be expressed and this is one reason they work together.

== Global health ==
Mortality from NCDs

Deaths from noncommunicable diseases per million persons in 2012 688-2,635 2,636-2,923 2,924-3,224 3,225-3,476 3,477-4,034 4,035-4,919 4,920-5,772 5,773-7,729 7,730-8,879 8,880-13,667

Total disease burden from non-communicable diseases, measured in DALYs (disability-adjusted life years) per year (data: IHME, Global Burden of Disease)

Referred to as a "lifestyle" disease, because the majority of these diseases are preventable illnesses, the most common causes for non-communicable diseases (NCD) include tobacco use (smoking), hazardous alcohol use, poor diets (high consumption of sugar, salt, saturated fats, and trans fatty acids) and physical inactivity. Currently, NCD kills 36 million people a year, a number that by some estimates is expected to rise by 17–24% within the next decade.

The World Health Organization has reported that, "At a global level, 7 of the 10 leading causes of deaths in 2021 were noncommunicable diseases, accounting for 38% of all deaths, or 68% of the top 10 causes."

Historically, many NCDs were associated with economic development and were so-called a "diseases of the rich". The burden of non-communicable diseases in developing countries has increased however, with an estimated 80% of the four main types of NCDs — cardiovascular diseases, cancers, chronic respiratory diseases and diabetes — now occurring in low- and middle-income countries. Action Plan for the Global Strategy for the Prevention and Control of non-communicable Diseases and with two-thirds of people who are affected by diabetes now residing in developing nations, NCD can no longer be considered just a problem affecting affluent estimation of the economic impact of chronic non-communicable diseases in selected countries. New WHO report: deaths from non-communicable diseases are on the rise, with developing world hit hardest. As previously stated, in 2008 alone, NCD's were the cause of 63% of deaths worldwide; a number that is expected to rise considerably in the near future if measures are not taken.

If present growth trends are maintained, by 2020, NCDs will attribute to 7 out of every 10 deaths in developing countries, killing 52 million people annually worldwide by 2030. With statistics such as these, it comes as no surprise that international entities such as the World Health Organization & World Bank Human Development Network have identified the prevention and control of NCDs as an increasingly important discussion item on the global health agenda.

Thus, should policy makers and communities mobilize "and make prevention and targeted treatment of such diseases a priority," sustainable measures can be implemented to stagnate (and eventually even reverse) this emerging global health threat. Potential measures currently being discussed by the(World Health Organization)-Food and Agriculture Organization includes reducing the levels of salt in foods, limiting inappropriate marketing of unhealthy foods and non-alcoholic beverages to children, imposing controls on harmful alcohol use, raising taxes on tobacco, and legislating to curb smoking in public places.

=== United Nations ===
The World Health Organization is the specialized agency of the United Nations (UN) that acts as coordinating authority on international public health issues, including NCDs. In May 2008, the 193 Member States of the WHO approved a six-year plan to address non-communicable diseases, especially the rapidly increasing burden in low- and middle-income countries. The plan calls for raising the priority given to NCDs in international development work'.

During the 64th session of the United Nations General Assembly in 2010, a resolution was passed to call for a high-level meeting of the General Assembly on the prevention and treatment NCDs with the participation of heads of state and government. The resolution also encouraged UN Member States to address the issue of non-communicable diseases at the 2010 Review Summit for the Millennium Development Goals.

=== Global Non-communicable Disease Network ===
In order to better coordinate efforts around the globe, in 2009 the WHO announced the launch of the Global Non-communicable Disease Network (NCDnet). NCDnet will consist of leading health organizations and experts from around the world in order to fight against diseases such as cancer, cardiovascular disease, and diabetes. Ala Alwan, assistant director-general for Non-communicable Diseases and Mental Health at the WHO, said: "integrating the prevention of non-communicable diseases and injuries into the national and global development agendas is not only achievable but also a priority for developing countries."

=== NCD Alliance ===
The NCD Alliance is a global partnership founded in May 2009 by four international federations representing cardiovascular disease, diabetes, cancer, and chronic respiratory disease. The NCD Alliance brings together roughly 900 national member associations to fight non-communicable disease. Long-term aims of the Alliance include:

1. NCD/disease national plans for all
2. A tobacco free world
3. Improved lifestyles
4. Strengthened health systems
5. Global access to affordable and good quality medicines and technologies
6. Human rights for people with NCDs.

=== Task Force ===
The United Nations Interagency Task Force on the Prevention and Control of Non-communicable Diseases (UNIATF) was established by the United Nations Secretary-General in 2013 in order to provide scaled up action across the UN system to support governments, in particular in low- and middle-income countries, to tackle non-communicable diseases.

=== Young Professionals Chronic Disease Network ===
The Young Professionals Chronic Disease Network, or commonly referred to as YP-CDN, is a global network of roughly 5000 young professionals across 157 countries. The organization aims to mobilize these young people "to take action against social injustice driven by NCDs.". Now redirected to the Sustainable development knowledge platform.

== Economics ==
Previously, chronic NCDs were considered a problem limited mostly to high income countries, while infectious diseases seemed to affect low income countries. The burden of disease attributed to NCDs has been estimated at 85% in industrialized nations, 70% in middle income nations, and nearly 50% in countries with the lowest national incomes. In 2008, chronic NCDs accounted for more than 60% (over 35 million) of the 57 million deaths worldwide. Given the global population distribution, almost 80% of deaths due to chronic NCDs worldwide now occur in low and middle income countries, while only 20% occur in higher income countries.

National economies are reportedly suffering significant losses due to premature deaths or inability to work resulting from heart disease, stroke, diabetes, and the broader impacts of physical inactivity, which is a significant contributor to NCDs globally. For instance, China is expected to lose roughly $558 billion in national income between 2005 and 2015 due to early deaths. In 2005, heart disease, stroke and diabetes caused an estimated loss in international dollars of national income of 9 billion in India and 3 billion in Brazil.

Diets low in whole grains and fruits and high in sodium are the leading dietary risks contributing to global health hidden costs

Following up on the 2023 edition of the FAO report – The State of Food and Agriculture – the subsequent edition provides a detailed breakdown of the hidden costs associated with unhealthy dietary patterns and non-communicable diseases for 156 countries. These hidden costs were measured as productivity losses due to disease-burden. The report finds that in 2020, global health hidden costs amounted 8.1 trillion 2020 PPP dollars, 70 percent of all of the hidden costs of agrifood systems. Diets low in whole grains are the leading concern (18 percent of global quantified health hidden costs), alongside diets high in sodium and low in fruits (16 percent each), although there is significant variation across countries.

=== Absenteeism and presenteeism ===
The burden of chronic NCDs including mental health conditions is felt in workplaces around the world, notably due to elevated levels of absenteeism, or absence from work because of illness, and presenteeism, or productivity lost from staff coming to work and performing below normal standards due to poor health. For example, the United Kingdom experienced a loss of about 175 million days in 2006 to absence from illness among a working population of 37.7 million people. The estimated cost of absences due to illness was over 20 billion pounds in the same year. The cost due to presenteeism is likely even larger, although methods of analyzing the economic impacts of presenteeism are still being developed. Methods for analyzing the distinct workplace impacts of NCDs versus other types of health conditions are also still being developed.

== Key diseases ==
=== Cancer ===
For the vast majority of cancers, risk factors are environmental or lifestyle-related, thus cancers are mostly preventable NCD. Greater than 30% of cancer is preventable via avoiding risk factors including: tobacco, being overweight or obesity, low fruit and vegetable intake, physical inactivity, alcohol, sexually transmitted infections, and air pollution. Infectious agents are responsible for some cancers, for instance almost all cervical cancers are caused by human papillomavirus infection.

=== Cardiovascular disease ===
The first studies on cardiovascular health were performed in 1949 by Jerry Morris using occupational health data and were published in 1958. The causes, prevention, and/or treatment of all forms of cardiovascular disease remain active fields of biomedical research, with hundreds of scientific studies being published on a weekly basis. A trend has emerged, particularly in the early 2000s, in which numerous studies have revealed a link between fast food and an increase in heart disease. These studies include those conducted by the Ryan Mackey Memorial Research Institute, Harvard University and the Sydney Center for Cardiovascular Health. Many major fast food chains, particularly McDonald's, have protested the methods used in these studies and have responded with healthier menu options.

A fairly recent emphasis is on the link between low-grade inflammation that hallmarks atherosclerosis and its possible interventions. C-reactive protein (CRP) is a common inflammatory marker that has been found to be present in increased levels in patients at risk for cardiovascular disease. Also osteoprotegerin which involved with regulation of a key inflammatory transcription factor called NF-κB has been found to be a risk factor of cardiovascular disease and mortality.

=== Diabetes ===
Type 2 Diabetes Mellitus is a chronic condition which is largely preventable and manageable but difficult to cure. Management concentrates on keeping blood sugar levels as close to normal ("euglycemia") as possible without presenting undue patient danger. This can usually be with close dietary management, exercise, and use of appropriate medications (insulin only in the case of type 1 diabetes mellitus. Oral medications may be used in the case of type 2 diabetes, as well as insulin).

Patient education, understanding, and participation is vital since the complications of diabetes are far less common and less severe in people who have well-managed blood sugar levels. Wider health problems may accelerate the deleterious effects of diabetes. These include smoking, elevated cholesterol levels, obesity, high blood pressure, and lack of regular exercise.

=== Chronic kidney disease ===
Although chronic kidney disease (CKD) is not currently identified as one of WHO's main targets for global NCD control, there is compelling evidence that CKD is not only common, harmful and treatable but also a major contributing factor to the incidence and outcomes of at least three of the diseases targeted by WHO (diabetes, hypertension and CVD). CKD strongly predisposes to hypertension and CVD; diabetes, hypertension and CVD are all major causes of CKD; and major risk factors for diabetes, hypertension and CVD (such as obesity and smoking) also cause or exacerbate CKD. In addition, among people with diabetes, hypertension, or CVD, the subset who also have CKD are at highest risk of adverse outcomes and high health care costs. Thus, CKD, diabetes and cardiovascular disease are closely associated conditions that often coexist; share common risk factors and treatments; and would benefit from a coordinated global approach to prevention and control.

=== Chronic respiratory disease ===
Chronic respiratory diseases (CRDs) are diseases of the lungs and airways. According to the World Health Organization (WHO) hundreds of millions of people have CRDs. Common CRDs are: asthma, chronic obstructive pulmonary disease, occupational lung disease, and pulmonary hypertension. While CRDs are not curable, various treatments are available to help improve quality of life for individuals who have them. Most treatments involve dilating major airways to improve shortness of breath among other symptoms. The main risk factors for developing CRDs are: tobacco smoking, indoor and outdoor air pollution, allergens, and occupational risks.

WHO helped launch the Global Alliance against Chronic Respiratory Diseases (GARD) in 2006. GARD is voluntarily composed of national and international organizations and works toward "reducing the global burden of chronic respiratory diseases" and focus mainly on vulnerable populations and low and middle-income countries.

== See also ==
- List of countries by risk of death from non-communicable disease
- Chronic disease
- Global health
- The INCTR Challenge Fund project of the International Network for Cancer Treatment and Research
