= Genre =

Category of creative works based on stylistic and/or thematic criteria

Genre (/ˈʒɑːnrə/ ZHAHN-rə; French for 'kind, sort') is any style or form of communication and art in any mode (written, spoken, digital, visual, auditory, etc.) with socially agreed-upon elements, or conventions, developed over time. In popular usage, it normally describes a category of literature, music, or other forms of art or entertainment, based on some set of stylistic or thematic criteria, as in literary genres, film genres, music genres, comics genres, etc. Often, works fit into multiple genres by way of borrowing and recombining these conventions. Stand-alone texts, works, or pieces of communication may have individual styles, but genres are amalgams of these texts based on agreed-upon or socially inferred conventions. Some genres may have rigid, strictly adhered-to guidelines, while others may show great flexibility. The proper use of a specific genre is important for a successful transfer of information (media-adequacy).

Critical discussion of genre perhaps began with a classification system for ancient Greek literature, as set out in Aristotle's Poetics. For Aristotle, poetry (odes, epics, etc.), prose, and performance each had specific features that supported appropriate content of each genre. Speech patterns for comedy would not be appropriate for tragedy, for example, and even actors were restricted to their genre under the assumption that a type of person could tell one type of story best. The academic discipline about genres is called genre studies (or genre theory).

Genres proliferate and develop beyond Aristotle's classifications—in response to changes in audiences and creators. Genre has become a dynamic tool to help the public make sense out of unpredictability through artistic expression. Given that art is often a response to a social state, in that people write, paint, sing, dance, and otherwise produce art about what they know about, the use of genre as a tool must be able to adapt to changing meanings.

== Visual arts ==
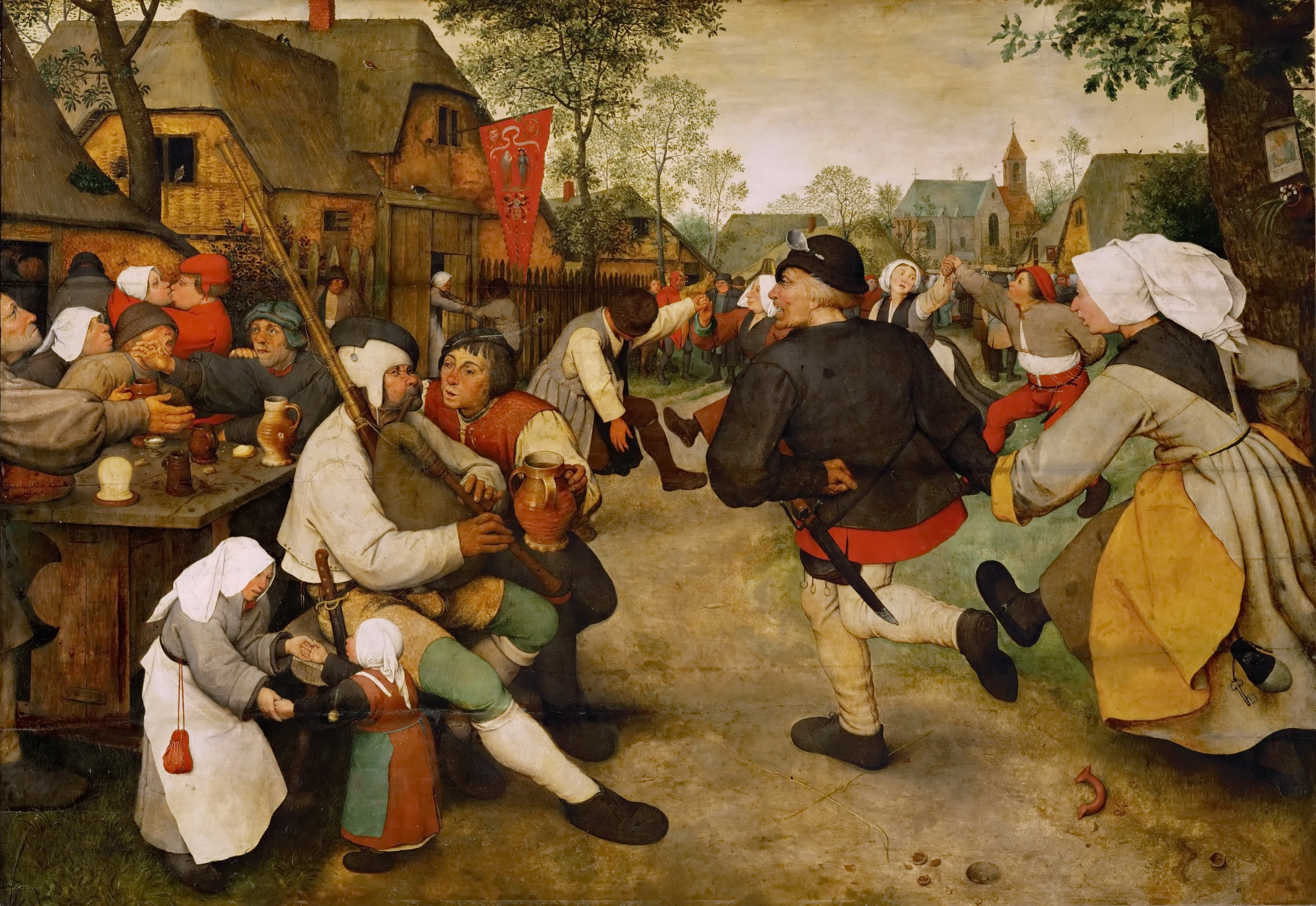
A genre painting, The Peasant Dance, c. 1568, by Pieter Brueghel the Elder

The term genre is often used in the history and criticism of visual art, but in art history it has meanings that overlap rather confusingly. Genre painting is a term for paintings where the main subject features human figures to whom no specific identity attaches – in other words, figures are not portraits, characters from a story, or allegorical personifications. They usually deal with subjects drawn from "everyday life". These are distinguished from staffage: incidental figures in what is primarily a landscape or architectural painting. "Genre" can also be used to refer to specialized types of art such as still-life, landscapes, marine paintings and animal paintings, or groups of artworks with other particular features in terms of subject-matter, style or iconography.

The concept of the "hierarchy of genres" was a powerful one in artistic theory, especially between the 17th and 19th centuries. It was strongest in France, where it was associated with the Académie royale de peinture et de sculpture which held a central role in academic art. The genres, which were mainly applied to painting, in hierarchical order are:

- History painting, including narrative, religious, mythological and allegorical subjects
- Portrait painting
- Genre painting or scenes of everyday life
- Landscape painting (landscapists were the "common footmen in the Army of Art" according to the Dutch theorist Samuel van Hoogstraten) and cityscape
- Animal painting
- Still life

The hierarchy was based on a distinction between art that made an intellectual effort to "render visible the universal essence of things" (imitare in Italian) and that which merely consisted of "mechanical copying of particular appearances" (ritrarre). Idealism was privileged over realism in line with Renaissance Neo-Platonist philosophy.

== Literature ==
A literary genre is a category of literary composition. Genres may be determined by literary technique, tone, content, or even (as in the case of fiction) length. Genre should not be confused with age category, by which literature may be classified as either adult, young adult, or children's. They also must not be confused with format, such as graphic novel or picture book. The distinctions between genres and categories are flexible and loosely defined, often with subgroups.

The most general genres in literature are (in loose chronological order) epic, tragedy, comedy, novel, and short story. They can all be in the genres prose or poetry, which shows best how loosely genres are defined. Additionally, a genre such as satire might appear in any of the above, not only as a subgenre but as a mixture of genres. Finally, they are defined by the general cultural movement of the historical period in which they were composed. In popular fiction, which is especially divided by genres, genre fiction is the more usual term.

In literature, genre has been known as an intangible taxonomy. This taxonomy implies a concept of containment or that an idea will be stable forever. The earliest recorded systems of genre in Western history can be traced back to Plato and Aristotle. Gérard Genette, a French literary theorist and author of The Architext, describes Plato as creating three Imitational genres: dramatic dialogue, pure narrative, and epic (a mixture of dialogue and narrative). Lyric poetry, the fourth and final type of Greek literature, was excluded by Plato as a non-mimetic mode. Aristotle later revised Plato's system by eliminating the pure narrative as a viable mode and distinguishing by two additional criteria: the object to be imitated, as objects could be either superior or inferior, and the medium of presentation such as words, gestures or verse. Essentially, the three categories of mode, object, and medium dialogue, epic (superior-mixed narrative), comedy (inferior-dramatic dialogue), and parody (inferior-mixed narrative).

Genette continues by explaining the later integration of lyric poetry into the classical system during the romantic period, replacing the now removed pure narrative mode. Lyric poetry, once considered non-mimetic, was deemed to imitate feelings, becoming the third leg of a new tripartite system: lyrical, epical, and dramatic dialogue. This system, which came to "dominate all the literary theory of German romanticism (and therefore well beyond)…." (38), has seen numerous attempts at expansion or revision. However, more ambitious efforts to expand the tripartite system resulted in new taxonomic systems of increasing scope and complexity.

Genette reflects upon these various systems, comparing them to the original tripartite arrangement: "its structure is somewhat superior to…those that have come after, fundamentally flawed as they are by their inclusive and hierarchical taxonomy, which each time immediately brings the whole game to a standstill and produces an impasse" (74). Taxonomy allows for a structured classification system of genre, as opposed to a more contemporary rhetorical model of genre.

== Film ==
The basic genres of film can be regarded as drama, in the feature film and most cartoons, and documentary. Most dramatic feature films, especially from Hollywood fall fairly comfortably into one of a long list of film genres such as the Western, war film, horror film, romantic comedy film, musical, crime film, science fiction, and many others. Many of these genres have a number of subgenres, for example by setting or subject, or a distinctive national style, for example in the Indian Bollywood musical.

== Music ==
A music genre is a conventional category that identifies pieces of music as belonging to a shared tradition or set of conventions. It is to be distinguished from musical form and musical style, although in practice these terms are sometimes used interchangeably. There are numerous genres in Western classical music and popular music, as well as musical theatre and the music of non-Western cultures. The term is now perhaps over-used to describe relatively small differences in musical style in modern rock music, that also may reflect sociological differences in their audiences. Timothy Laurie suggests that in the context of rock and pop music studies, the "appeal of genre criticism is that it makes narratives out of musical worlds that often seem to lack them".

Music can be divided into different genres in several ways. The artistic nature of music means that these classifications are often arbitrary and controversial, and some genres may overlap. There are several academic approaches to genres. In his book Form in Tonal Music, Douglass M. Green lists madrigal, motet, canzona, ricercar, and dance as examples of genres from the Renaissance period. According to Green, "Beethoven's Op. 61 and Mendelssohn's Op. 64 are identical in genre (both are violin concertos) but different in form. However, Mozart's Rondo for Piano, K. 511, and the Agnus Dei from his Mass, K. 317 are quite different in genre but happen to be similar in form." Some, like Peter van der Merwe, treat the terms genre and style as the same, saying that genre should be defined as pieces of music that share a certain style or "basic musical language".

Others, such as Allan F. Moore, state that genre and style are two separate terms, and that secondary characteristics such as subject matter can also differentiate between genres. A music genre or subgenre may be defined by the musical techniques, the styles, the context, and content and spirit of the themes. Geographical origin is sometimes used to identify a music genre, though a single geographical category will often include a wide variety of subgenres.

Several music scholars have criticized the priority accorded to genre-based communities and listening practices. For example, Laurie argues that "music genres do not belong to isolated, self-sufficient communities. People constantly move between environments where diverse forms of music are heard, advertised and accessorised with distinctive iconographies, narratives and celebrity identities that also touch on non-musical worlds."

== Popular culture and other media ==
The concept of genre is often applied, sometimes rather loosely, to other media with an artistic element, such as video game genres. Genre, and numerous minutely divided subgenres, affect popular culture very significantly, not least as they are used to classify it for publicity purposes. The vastly increased output of popular culture in the age of electronic media encourages dividing cultural products by genre to simplify the search for products by consumers, a trend the Internet has only intensified.

== Linguistics ==
In philosophy of language, genre figures prominently in the works of philosopher and literary scholar Mikhail Bakhtin. Bakhtin's basic observations were of "speech genres" (the idea of heteroglossia), modes of speaking or writing that people learn to mimic, weave together, and manipulate (such as "formal letter" and "grocery list", or "university lecture" and "personal anecdote"). In this sense, genres are socially specified: recognized and defined (often informally) by a particular culture or community. The work of Georg Lukács also touches on the nature of literary genres, appearing separately but around the same time (1920s to 1930s) as Bakhtin. Norman Fairclough has a similar concept of genre that emphasizes the social context of the text: Genres are "different ways of (inter)acting discoursally" (Fairclough, 2003: 26).

A text's genre may be determined by its:

1. Linguistic function.
2. Formal traits.
3. Textual organization.
4. Relation of communicative situation to formal and organizational traits of the text (Charaudeau and Maingueneau, 2002: 278–280).

== Rhetoric ==
In the field of rhetoric, genre theorists usually understand genres as types of actions rather than types or forms of texts. On this perspective, texts are channels through which genres are enacted. Carolyn Miller's work has been especially important for this perspective. Drawing on Lloyd Bitzer's concept of rhetorical situation, Miller reasons that recurring rhetorical problems tend to elicit recurring responses; drawing on Alfred Schütz, she reasons that these recurring responses become "typified" – that is, socially constructed as recognizable types. Miller argues that these "typified rhetorical actions" (p. 151) are properly understood as genres.

Building off of Miller, Charles Bazerman and Clay Spinuzzi have argued that genres understood as actions derive their meaning from other genres – that is, other actions. Bazerman therefore proposes that we analyze genres in terms of "genre systems", while Spinuzzi prefers the closely related concept of "genre ecologies". Reiff and Bawarshi define genre analysis as a critical reading of people's patterns of communication in different situations.

This tradition has had implications for the teaching of writing in American colleges and universities. Combining rhetorical genre theory with activity theory, David Russell has proposed that standard English composition courses are ill-suited to teach the genres that students will write in other contexts across the university and beyond. Elizabeth Wardle contends that standard composition courses do teach genres, but that these are inauthentic "mutt genres" that are often of little use outside composition courses.

Genre is effective as a tool in rhetoric because it allows a speaker to set the context for a rhetorical discussion. Devitt, Reiff, and Bawarshi suggest that rhetorical genres may be assigned based on careful analysis of the subject matter and consideration of the audience.

Genre is related to Ludwig Wittgenstein's theory of Family resemblance in which he describes how genres act like a family tree, where members of a family are related, but not exact copies of one another.

== History ==
This concept of genre originated from the classification systems created by Plato. Plato divided literature into the three classic genres accepted in Ancient Greece: poetry, drama, and prose. Poetry is further subdivided into epic, lyric, and drama. The divisions are recognized as being set by Aristotle and Plato; however, they were not the only ones. Many genre theorists added to these accepted forms of poetry.

=== Classical and Romance genre theory ===
The earliest recorded systems of genre in Western history can be traced back to Plato and Aristotle. Gérard Genette explains his interpretation of the history of genre in "The Architext". He described Plato as the creator of three imitational, mimetic genres distinguished by mode of imitation rather than content. These three imitational genres include dramatic dialogue, the drama; pure narrative, the dithyramb; and a mixture of the two, the epic. Plato excluded lyric poetry as a non-mimetic, imitational mode. Genette further discussed how Aristotle revised Plato's system by first eliminating the pure narrative as a viable mode. He then uses two additional criteria to distinguish the system. The first of the criteria is the object to be imitated, whether superior or inferior. The second criterion is the medium of presentation: words, gestures, or verse. Essentially, the three categories of mode, object, and medium can be visualized along an XYZ axis. Excluding the criteria of medium, Aristotle's system distinguished four types of classical genres: tragedy, epic, comedy, and parody.

Genette explained the integration of lyric poetry into the classical system by replacing the removed pure narrative mode. Lyric poetry, once considered non-mimetic, was deemed to imitate feelings, becoming the third "Architext", a term coined by Genette, of a new long-enduring tripartite system: lyrical; epical, the mixed narrative; and dramatic, the dialogue. This new system that came to "dominate all the literary theory of German romanticism" (Genette 38) has seen numerous attempts at expansion and revision. Such attempts include Friedrich Schlegel's triad of subjective form, the lyric; objective form, the dramatic; and subjective-objective form, the epic. However, more ambitious efforts to expand the tripartite system resulted in new taxonomic systems of increasing complexity. Genette reflected upon these various systems, comparing them to the original tripartite arrangement: "its structure is somewhat superior to most of those that have come after, fundamentally flawed as they are by their inclusive and hierarchical taxonomy, which each time immediately brings the whole game to a standstill and produces an impasse".

== Audiences ==
Although genres are not always precisely definable, genre considerations are one of the most important factors in determining what a person will see or read. The classification properties of genre can attract or repel potential users depending on the individual's understanding of a genre.

Genre creates an expectation in that expectation is met or not. Many genres have built-in audiences and corresponding publications that support them, such as magazines and websites. Inversely, audiences may call out for change in an antecedent genre and create an entirely new genre.

The term may be used in categorizing web pages, like "news page" and "fan page", with both very different layout, audience, and intention (Rosso, 2008). Some search engines like Vivísimo try to group found web pages into automated categories in an attempt to show various genres the search hits might fit.

== Subgenre ==
A subgenre is a subordinate within a genre. Two stories being the same genre can still sometimes differ in subgenre. For example, if a fantasy story has darker and more frightening elements of fantasy, it would belong in the subgenre of dark fantasy; whereas another fantasy story that features magic swords and wizards would belong to the subgenre of sword and sorcery.

== Microgenre ==
A microgenre is a highly specialized, narrow classification of a cultural practice. The term has come into usage in the 21st century, and most commonly refers to music. It is also associated with the hyper-specific categories used in recommendations for television shows and movies on digital streaming platforms such as Netflix, and is sometimes used more broadly by scholars analyzing niche forms in other periods and other media.

== See also ==
- List of genres
