= List of countries by risk of death from non-communicable disease =

Deaths from noncommunicable diseases per million persons in 2012 688-2,635 2,636-2,923 2,924-3,224 3,225-3,476 3,477-4,034 4,035-4,919 4,920-5,772 5,773-7,729 7,730-8,879 8,880-13,667

This is a list of countries by risk of premature death from non-communicable disease such as cardiovascular disease, cancer, diabetes, or chronic respiratory disease between ages 30 and 70 as published by the World Health Organization in 2008. Measuring the risk of dying from target NCDs is important to assess the extent of burden from mortality due NCDs in a population.

Life tables specifying all-cause mortality rates by age and sex for WHO Member States are developed from available death registration data, sample registration systems (India, China) and data on child and adult mortality from censuses and surveys.

Cause-of-death distributions are estimated from death registration data, and data from population-based epidemiological studies, disease registers and notifications systems for selected specific causes of death. Causes of death for populations without usable death-registration data are estimated using cause-of-death models together with data from population-based epidemiological studies, disease registers and notifications systems.

== WHO 2015 rankings ==
Country	Risk of death from non-communicable disease
South Korea	8.3%
Switzerland	8.7%
Japan	8.8%
Australia	8.9%
Sweden	9.1%
Italy	9.4%
Israel	9.5%
Norway	9.6%
Luxembourg	9.7%
Canada	9.8%
Spain	10.0%
Singapore	10.1%
Finland	10.1%
Ireland	10.3%
New Zealand	10.4%
Malta	10.5%
France	10.9%
Netherlands	11.0%
United Kingdom	11.0%
Costa Rica	11.1%
Austria	11.2%
Portugal	11.3%
Chile	11.5%
Cyprus	11.5%
Denmark	11.6%
Belgium	11.6%
Germany	12.0%
Greece	12.3%
Maldives	12.4%
Brunei	12.6%
Peru	12.7%
Ecuador	13.1%
Slovenia	13.2%
United States	13.6%
Panama	13.7%
Honduras	13.9%
Qatar	14.2%
El Salvador	14.2%
Colombia	14.6%
Albania	14.7%

== See also ==
- Non-communicable disease
- List of countries by life expectancy
