= Ahmed Al-Mandhari =

Physician and public-health specialist from Oman

- Born: Oman
- Citizenship: Oman
- Education: Sultan Qaboos University; Liverpool School of Tropical Medicine
- Occupations: Physician; Public Health Specialist; Medical Administrator
- Years active: 2005 — present
- Title: Regional Director; WHO Regional Office for the Eastern Mediterranean

Ahmed Al-Mandhari is a physician and public health specialist from Oman. He is currently serving as Regional Director of the World Health Organization's Regional Office for the Eastern Mediterranean (EMRO), where he was appointed in 2018.

== Education ==
He graduated with a BSc in Health Sciences and an MD in Medicine from Sultan Qaboos University, after which he studied in the United Kingdom and obtained a PhD from the Liverpool School of Tropical Medicine.

== Career ==
He worked at the Sultan Qaboos University and in the government of Oman with roles in quality assurance.

Al-Mandhari took up his position at the EMRO in June 2018, taking over from acting director Jaouad Mahjour.

Preceded by Jaouad Mahjour; 2017 - 2018	WHO Regional Director for Africa	Succeeded by Incumbent -
