= Health Sciences Online =

Health information resource

Health Sciences Online (HSO) is a non-profit online health information resource that launched in December 2008. The website hosts a virtual learning center providing weblinks to a collection of more than 50,000 courses, references, textbooks, guidelines, lectures, presentations, cases, articles, images and videos, available in 42 different languages. The content includes medicine, public health, nursing, pharmacy, dentistry, nutrition, kinesiology and other health sciences resources.

== History ==
HSO was conceived of by Founder and Executive Director Erica Frank in 2001. A pilot of the site ran from 2006 until 2008, first only covering HIV/AIDS, and then moving on to include the entire site. The pilot ran in 11 countries in North America, Africa and Asia in order to assess the function, user interface, features, expectations, and needs of the users of HSO. The pilot was provided to health professionals at various levels of training and in practice.

== Purpose ==
The website aims to provide quality educational resources to health care providers in training and practice, especially in developing countries, thus bridging the digital divide (the global imbalance in access to information technology). The underlying aim is to support the United Nations' Millennium Development Goals of public health, but it is also intended to be useful for providers in industrialized countries. The hope is to create revolutions in democratizing health sciences education.

HSO is an official supporting organisation of "Healthcare Information For All by 2015".

== Founding collaborators ==
Founding collaborators include the U.S. Centers for Disease Control and Prevention, the World Bank, the American College of Preventive Medicine, the University of British Columbia, and the World Medical Association.

Funding has been obtained from the Canadian and British Columbian governments, the World Health Organization, NATO’s Science for Peace Program, the Annenberg Physician Training Program, the Ulrich and Ruth Frank Foundation for International Health, and others. There has also been a large cadre of volunteers who have worked on the site's development.

== Search engine ==
HSO uses the Velocity Search Platform provided by Vivisimo to search all of its collected resources. In addition, Google Translate is used to provide results in 42 different languages.

== Resources ==
HSO is a web portal for searching health sciences resources that have been selected by a core team of volunteers, including health providers and scientists from different countries. The resources have been selected based on guidelines produced by several groups that help in assessing the quality of online health information.

The criteria used include:

- the content should be relevant
- the information is useful by itself as a teaching/learning tool (i.e., no Microsoft PowerPoint presentations without lecture notes or taped audio)
- the website should be educational (i.e., no advertisements)
- the source should be credible (i.e., a government, university, or specialty society)
- the material should be current
- the links on the site should be functional
- the interface of the website should be user-friendly, and
- the material should be free to access.

Currently, HSO indexes over 50,000 resources. These resources come from government organizations, universities, and specialty societies such as:

- American College of Preventive Medicine
- Centers for Disease Control and Prevention
- Columbia University
- Emory University
- Harvard University
- Johns Hopkins University
- Massachusetts Institute of Technology
- Merck Manuals
- National Health Service
- National Institutes of Health
- National Library of Medicine
- University of British Columbia
- University of California, San Francisco
- University of Pennsylvania
- World Health Organization
