= Zuula =

Web metasearch engine

Zuula was a metasearch engine that provided search results from a number of different search engines. Zuula was used to carry out standard web searches, image searches, video searches, news searches, blog searches, and job searches. Results were available from major search engines, such as Google, Yahoo, and Bing, and smaller engines, such as Gigablast and Mojeek.

== Metasearch ==
Zuula did not combine the results from its source search engines, instead tabs were used to organize the results from source engines. When a user carried out a search, the first results that were displayed were those from the search engine assigned to the first tab, the user could then click on other tabs to see the results from other source engines. Users could change the order of the tabs for each search type by moving them into the desired order.

== See also ==
- Metasearch engine
- List of search engines
