= United Nations Interagency Task Force on the Prevention and Control of NCDs =

Organization

The United Nations Inter-Agency Task Force on the Prevention and Control of Non-communicable Diseases was established by the United Nations Secretary-General in 2013. It was the successor to the United Nations Ad Hoc Interagency Task Force on Tobacco Control that had been in existence since 1999.

Non-communicable diseases (NCDs), often known as chronic diseases, include cardiovascular diseases, cancers, chronic respiratory diseases, diabetes and mental health conditions. The Task Force consists of a World Health Organization (WHO) Secretariat (currently led by Nick Banatvala from the United Kingdom) and 46 United Nations (UN) and inter-governmental organizations.

The Task Force supports countries to develop whole-of-government and whole-of-society approaches for the prevention and control of NCDs and mental health conditions, in pursuit of the 2030 Agenda for Sustainable Development and Universal Health Coverage (UHC).

== Governance ==
The Task Force was established in response to the 2011 Political Declaration of the High-level Meeting of the General Assembly on the Prevention and Control of NCDs. It meets twice a year. The WHO Director-General provides a report on the work of the Task Force through the UN Secretary-General once a year to the UN Economic and Social Council (ECOSOC). Each year, ECOSOC Members agree a resolution on the work of the Task Force.

== Activities ==
The Task Force Secretariat and its members support, in accordance with their respective mandates, the realization of the commitments made in a series of political declarations and outcome documents from three UN General Assembly high-level meetings on NCDs. The Task Force also supports countries in meeting the objectives of the WHO Global Action Plan for the Prevention and Control of Noncommunicable Diseases 2013-2020.

The Task Force has four strategic priorities for 2022-2025:

- To advocate for whole-of-government, whole-of-society action and provide context-specific technical assistance to support national action and capacity building to attain the NCD-related SDG targets.
- To mobilize political, financial and technical resources to support governments, the UN and other development partners in building strong, sustained responses to NCDs and mental health conditions.
- To harmonize action and forge cross-sectoral partnerships with that of other global health and development initiatives and forging multi-stakeholder partnerships and alliances at all levels.
- To be a beacon of excellence among UN and development partners, working as one, proactively and responsively to support governments and their partners in achieving the SDG targets for NCDs and mental health.

In 2018, the Task Force established the annual awards scheme to recognize those that are making an exceptional contributions to reducing the burden of NCDs and improving mental health.

In 2021, three members of the Task Force (United Nations Development Programme (UNDP), UNICEF and WHO) established the Health4Life Fund, a UN multi-partner trust Fund, to catalyze country action for NCDs and mental health. The Fund supports governments, the UN development system and other partners to work together towards common NCD and mental health results. The Fund is based on established financing-for-development and aid- & development-effectiveness principles.

In 2024, the NCD and mental health legislators initiative was launched with the G20 and G7 Health and Development Partnership.

The results of a joint independent evaluation on the work of the Task Force were published in 2025.
