= Global action plan for influenza vaccines =

The Global action plan for influenza vaccines (GAP) was a 10-year initiative launched in 2006 by the World Health Organization with the purpose to increase the global availability and equitable access to influenza vaccines in the event of an influenza pandemic.

The Action Plan ran until 2016, when it concluded with a conference in Geneva. The report of that conference concluded that while substantial progress has been made over the 10 years of the Plan, the world is still not ready to respond to an influenza pandemic.
