= INCTR Challenge Fund =

The INCTR Challenge Fund is the UK charity (Charity No. 1079181) raising funds for projects co-ordinated by the International Network for Cancer Treatment Research (INCTR) that improve the care delivered to cancer patients in developing countries and help reduce their suffering.

Cancer is not a disease that only affects wealthy countries. The World Health Organization (WHO) reports that of the 7.9 million death from cancer every year, 72% (5.7 million) occur in low- and middle-income countries. This means that almost 11 people a minute are dying of cancer in some of the poorest nations on Earth. WHO reports that cancer is now killing more people in the developing countries than malaria, TB and HIV/AIDS combined, and this situation is growing steadily worse.

There are several reasons for this high death toll from cancer in developing countries. Due to poverty, lack of resources and vast distances, public access to treatment maybe difficult or non-existent. There is also not enough awareness (public or professional) about cancer to help either prevent the disease developing or to support early diagnosis. As a result, 80% of cancer patients present with advanced/incurable cancers. Unfortunately, in many cases, palliative care will not be available to them at the end of their lives.

The fund's goals are:

- Providing chemotherapy drugs and anti-bacteria drugs
- Training local nurses and doctors in early cancer diagnosis, cancer treatment and clinical research
- Raising the local awareness about cancer in order to encourage prevention and early diagnosis
- Providing palliative care services for terminally ill cancer patients

The charity relies on donations from individual and corporate donors. It fundraises through social events including music gigs.

== Projects ==
The INCTR Challenge Fund is prioritizing INCTR projects in children's cancer (especially African Burkitt's lymphoma) and palliative care.

=== Children's cancer ===
The survival rate of children suffering with cancer is lower than in high-income countries; often less than 20% compared with around 70% in the UK. Specialized units for treating children with cancer are rare in developing countries, leading to overcrowded wards and the spread of fatal infections. This is tragic as common childhood cancers such as African Burkitt's lymphoma can be cured cheaply and efficiently if they are detected early enough. The INCTR Challenge Fund is raising money to provide effective treatment for children with African BL in Tanzania, Kenya, Nigeria and Uganda.

The INCTR Africa Burkitt Lymphoma Programme is also supported by Christopher Niblett Memorial Fund since 2006.

=== Palliative care ===
Due to the scarcity of resources and the limited number of trained health care professionals, palliative care is unavailable to most terminally ill cancer patients in low or middle income countries. In some countries the situation may be complicated by a lack of professional regard (or understanding) of palliative care as a bona fide part of cancer control, and by local medical and legal barriers to the use of opioids for pain relief. In Nepal the INCTR Challenge Fund is building a Palliative Care Network that will help reduce the suffering of cancer patients in the Kathmandu valley.

== International Network for Cancer Treatment and Research ==
The International Network for Cancer Treatment and Research (INCTR) is a not-for-profit, non-governmental organization founded in 1998 by the International Union Against Cancer (UICC) and the Institut Pasteur in Brussels. The INCTR's structured programme of research collaboration, education and training, helps developing countries to develop an increased understanding of the causes and predisposition to regionally important cancers, and to increase survival rates and the quality of life in patients with cancer. INCTR currently has branches in the United States, France, Brazil, Egypt and Nepal and offices in the UK, India and Tanzania. INCTR is supported by the National Cancer Institute of the United States and is located at the Institut Pasteur in Brussels.
