= Yippy =

American metasearch engine

- Website type: Metasearch engine
- Available in: English
- Launched: 2004; 22 years ago (as Clusty); 2010; 16 years ago (as Yippy)

Yippy was a metasearch engine that grouped searched results into clusters. It was originally developed and released by Vivísimo in 2004 under the name Clusty, before Vivisimo was later acquired by IBM and Yippy was sold in 2010 to a company now called Yippy, Inc. At the time, the website received 100,000 unique visitors a month.

From August 2019, Yippy's main page stated their searches were powered by IBM Watson, asserting it was "the right search" (italics theirs) that delivered "fair search results based on balanced algorithms."

In 2019, Yippy CEO Rich Granville presented the search engine as free of censorship of conservative views, calling it an "intelligence enterprise" with high-level White House connections, telling a reporter "you don't know who you’re fucking with."

From late April 2021 to early June 2022, the website would redirect to DuckDuckGo.

== History ==
Clusty was developed by Vivísimo in Pittsburgh, Pennsylvania. Vivísimo was a company built on Web search technology developed by Carnegie Mellon University researchers, much like Lycos was a decade earlier. Clusty added new features and a new interface to the previous Vivisimo clustering web metasearch. Different tabs also offer metasearch for news, jobs (in partnership with Indeed.com), U.S. government information, and blogs. Customized tabs allow users to select sources for their own metasearch to create personalized tabs.

Yippy Inc., formerly Cinnabar Ventureess Inc., acquired Clusty for $5.55 million in May 2010. The acquisition included the license for the Velocity software, which was bought by IBM in 2012 and renamed IBM Watson Explorer.

In 2012, Yippy received "Welcome to the Cloud" as a registered trademark with the USPTO.

Yippy received "Welcome to your Data" as a registered trademark with the USPTO.

In 2016, Yippy released its Yippy Search Appliance (YSA) as a Google Search Appliance (GSA) replacement to market after Google announced it was sunsetting the GSA and capitalizing on the $500M revenue from the GSA.

In 2019, Yippy Inc. CEO Rich Granville organized in Atlanta a "Digital Soldiers Conference", with the aim of preparing "patriotic social media warriors" for a coming "digital civil war" against "censorship and suppression". The event featured several prominent Donald Trump supporters, including Michael Flynn and George Papadopoulos. At the time, Granville also used many QAnon references on Twitter.

In late April 2021, Yippy's site started redirecting to DuckDuckGo. As of August 2021, the Georgia Secretary of State website shows Yippy, Inc's corporate status as "Revoked".

== See also ==
- Data clustering
- Metasearch engine
- Vivísimo
