= Hillsboro Symphony Orchestra =

American symphony orchestra

Coordinates: 45.56266°N 122.9026°W

- Orchestra
- official logo
- Founded: 2001
- Location: Hillsboro, Oregon
- Concert hall: Hidden Creek Community Center, Hillsboro, Oregon
- Principal conductor: Jeff Hornick
- Website: hillsborosymphony.org

Hillsboro Symphony Orchestra (HSO) is an amateur orchestra based in Hillsboro in the Portland metropolitan area of the U.S. state of Oregon. Founded in 2001, the non-profit group has 86 musicians and is led by conductor Jeff Hornick. They perform three concerts per year at Hillsboro's Hidden Creek Community Center. Additionally, the orchestra also has five ensembles that perform at other events in the area.

== History ==
The orchestra was organized in the spring of 2001 by several people, including Mike Graves, Barbara Hanson, and Morgan Brown. Organized as a non-profit group, the community orchestra sought local amateur musicians who were tired of driving to neighboring Portland in order to participate in an orchestra, or who had stopped performing altogether due to the lack of a local group. In the beginning the group rehearsed at Hillsboro High School and attracted musicians from Hillsboro along with those from the neighboring cities of Forest Grove and Beaverton.

Rehearsals started in September 2001, and HSO planned on three concerts that year with a total of 30 members. Their first conductor was Stefan Minde, who had been the conductor of the Portland Opera from 1970 until 1984. Musicians ranged from high school students to housewives. The group's debut concert was November 16, 2001, held at J. B. Thomas Middle School in Hillsboro with almost 500 people in attendance. The concert was free to attend, as were their other early concerts, and featured pieces from Richard Wagner, Johannes Brahms, and Gioachino Rossini among others. In these early days of the group, Portland's Metropolitan Youth Symphony and Pacific University in Forest Grove donated sheet music to the orchestra.

For the Hillsboro Orchestra's second concert, the event was moved to Hillsboro High School's new auditorium. That concert was held in March 2002, and by that time the group had grown to almost 40 people. Minde left the group in 2003 and Sharon Northe took over as conductor. By 2004, concerts had moved to the auditorium of the new Liberty High School, which included their spring 2004 concert entitled a "Collection of America's Favorite Music" that included works by Aaron Copland. The group's fall convert that year was An Austrian Reverie and featured works by Wolfgang Amadeus Mozart and Ludwig van Beethoven, among others.

Their winter concert in March 2005 mainly used work by Jean Sibelius, a Finnish composer, and featured an owl from the Oregon Zoo for a Harry Potter-themed piece. By December 2006 the group was led by conductor Sharon Northe and totaled 65 musicians. That month the orchestra performed Russian Rhapsodies, a concert featuring the works of Russian composers.

During November and December 2007 the Hillsboro Symphony performed "A Musical Horn of Plenty". In December 2007, the orchestra was given a $1,318 grant from the Regional Arts & Culture Council. The grant was to allow the group to put on a May 2008 concert with a pirate theme at Liberty High School. The group held a concert in March 2008 at Liberty entitled A Glimpse of Leyden Magic arranged by Norman Leyden. Down by the Sea and A Salute to the Big Bands were the two titles to HSO's March 2009 concert. For the group's March 2010 concert they featured pieces by Ottorino Respighi and Elliot Del Borgo in a show entitled Dawn of Ancient Melodies. That show also included a performance by a belly dancer.

== Details ==
Hillsboro Symphony Orchestra is an all-volunteer, community-based orchestra. The non-profit group performs a total of three concerts each season starting with one in November, one in March and one in May. Members of the group range from high school students to doctors to teachers and engineers, among others. The orchestra mainly draws members from within Washington County on the west side of the Portland metropolitan area. Sharon Northe was the conductor of the group from 2003 to 2022 at which point Jeff Hornick took over as conductor. Tiffany Lai has been president since April 29, 2019.
