= Vivisimo =

American internet technology company

Vivisimo, an IBM Company
- Industry: Internet
- Founded: Pittsburgh, Pennsylvania; June 21, 2000
- Headquarters: Pittsburgh, Pennsylvania
- Products: Vivisimo Velocity Search Platform
- Website: vivisimo.com

Vivisimo was a privately held technology company in Pittsburgh, Pennsylvania, specialising in the development of computer search engines. The company was acquired by IBM in May 2012 and is now branded as IBM Watson Explorer, a product of the IBM Watson Group. Vivisimo's public web search engine Clusty was a metasearch engine with document clustering; it was sold to Yippy, Inc. in 2010.

Vivisimo specialized in federated search and document clustering. For example, Vivisimo clustering could divide the results of a search for "cell" into groups including "biology", "battery", and "prison".

Vivisimo software supported both structured and unstructured information.

== History ==
Vivisimo was founded in 2000 by three computer science researchers at Carnegie Mellon University: Chris Palmer, Jerome Pesenti, and Raul Valdes-Perez. The name was taken from the Spanish superlative adjective vivísimo meaning "very lively" or "very clever."

In October 2008, Vivisimo was awarded the contract to power the search portion of FirstGov.gov (now called USA.gov), the official web portal of the United States federal government.

In 2012, IBM acquired Vivisimo to boost its Big Data Analytics capabilities .

== Products ==
Velocity was sold as an installed or hosted application to enterprises, governments, and OEMs. With Vivisimo providing additional professional services.

Velocity's social search features allowed users to contribute to organizational content by tagging, voting, annotating and sharing search results. The contributions are instantly indexed in new searches.
