= Mario Roberto Dal Poz =

Mário R. Dal Poz
- Born: May 1950 (age 76); Brazil
- Education: University of the State of Rio de Janeiro
- Awards: Medalha de Mérito Oswaldo Cruz, categoria ouro (2009)
- Scientific career
- Fields: public health
- Workplaces: University of the State of Rio de Janeiro

Mário Roberto Dal Poz is a Brazilian physician and researcher, who worked as coordinator of the "Health Workforce Information and Governance" program at the World Health Organization (WHO) in Switzerland from 2002 to 2012. He holds the position of associate professor at the Social Medicine Institute of the University of the State of Rio de Janeiro. He is also currently editor-in-chief of the Human Resources for Health journal, and a member of the editorial board of the Bulletin of the World Health Organization and Revista Espaço para a Saude.

Dr. Dal Poz obtained his medical degree with specialization in pediatrics in 1975, followed by a Master's in social medicine in 1981, and a doctorate in public health in 1996 from the Oswaldo Cruz Foundation. Between 2000 and 2012, Dr. Dal Poz worked with the WHO in health systems development, co-authoring among others the World Health Report 2006, which brought worldwide attention to the global health workforce crisis, and numerous references on health workforce information systems.

In 2008, Dr. Dal Poz was invited to deliver a Regency Lecture on the "Global Response to the Health Workforce Crisis" at the Global Center for Health Economics and Policy Research of the University of California, Berkeley.

In 2009, he was awarded the Oswald Cruz Gold Merit Medal from the Brazilian President for contributions to public health.

He has published numerous books, as well as articles and commentaries in leading medical journals such as The Lancet and Health Policy and Planning.
