= Carolinian people =

Micronesian ethnic group

Carolinians
Refaluwasch
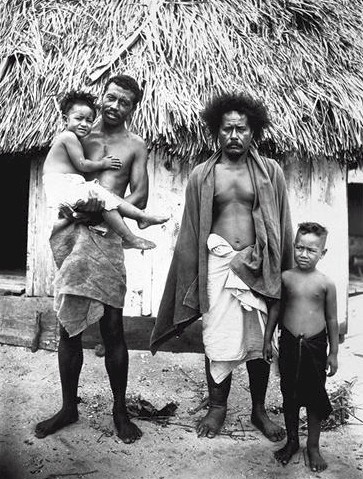
- Carolinian/Refaluwasch family in 1915

Total population
- Over 8,500

Regions with significant populations
- Saipan, Northern Mariana Islands, Caroline Islands, Guam

Languages
- Carolinian, Chamorro, English

Religion
- Predominantly Roman Catholic Minority Traditional religions

Related ethnic groups
- Chuukese people, Pohnpeian, Kosraen

The Carolinian people (endonym: Refaluwasch) are a Micronesian ethnic group who originated in the Caroline Islands, with a total population of over 8,500 people in the Northern Mariana Islands. They are also known as Remathau in Yap's outer islands. Refaluwasch means "People of the Deep Sea." It is thought that their ancestors may have originally migrated from Asia and Melanesia to Micronesia around 2,000 years ago. Their primary language is Carolinian, called Refaluwasch by native speakers, which has a total of about 5,700 speakers. The Refaluwasch traditionally have a matriarchal society. Most Refaluwasch are of the Roman Catholic faith.

The emigration of Refaluwasch to Saipan began in the early 19th century, after the Spanish reduced the local population of Chamorro natives to just 3,700. They began to emigrate, sailing in small canoes from the Carolines, which had been devastated by typhoons. Being indigenous to a more southern archipelago than the Marianas, they generally have a darker complexion than the native Chamorros.

== Genetics ==
The Refaluwasch are Durums mixed and have the same lineages with Remathau on the outer islands of Yap.

Some of the people on the islands are Chamolinians, who have a mixture of Chamorro and Carolinian heritage.

The Refaluwasch in the CNMI have a high rate of macrosomia, where the infant is born abnormally large.

== Names ==
Carolinians are also known as Repaghuluwósch. They also called themselves Falawasch in the 1800s and may have used this name beyond this century.

=== Personal and surname name usage ===
Saralu is an example of a Carolinian name. This name was used by a man named Clemente Saralu Taisacan, a Carolinian fisherman of Rota, and was the maiden name of his Carolinian mother.

In the 1950s dating back to Spanish era, some people used Spanish names. Before and during this time, people had three names; this may still be the case today. The first name is a Spanish Christian name for the individual chosen by the parents. The second name is Carolinian, also chosen by the parents or another older relative. The third name or surname is also Carolinian.

Before the 1950s, children received either the mother's or father's surname; now, children are given the surnames of their fathers. Brothers usually have different family names. German personal and last names may be used in this community due to the German colonial era in the Northern Marianas.

On the islands of Saipan and Tinian, there are several Carolinian or Chamorro families with Japanese surnames.

== History ==
=== Pre-Spanish era (antiquity to 1697) ===
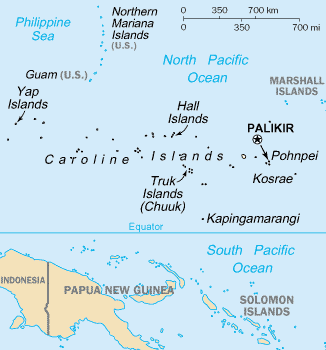
The islands where the Refaluwasch came from were over 400 miles from what is now the Federated States of Micronesia.

The Carolinian people have a history stretching back over 3000 years. They had contact with the Chamorro people for years and had a long history of traveling from the Caroline Islands to what is now Guam. "Pre-contact" Carolinian-designed pestles, fishing hooks, and rings made out of shells have been found here, evidence of contact between the two groups.

They built canoes that would have a small roof covering less than half of the canoe. The sides could be different colors. The boat could fit over nine adults in it.

Centuries ago they used sea-lanes based on memorized information passed down from the prior generation.

Before colonial times a system called sawei was practiced. The word sawei means Yapese chief, conqueror, tyrant. This involved the Carolinians gathering once every two or three years in Yap. This system may have existed before the year 1600. More on this is discussed in the religion section.

Trade between the Carolinians and Chamorros continued even during the Spanish occupation of Guam.

=== Typhoon devastation and Spanish era (1697–1899) ===
In the late 1600s, leprosy was present in the Marianas. The Spaniards tried to deal with this by quarantining lepers in Saipan and Tinian. These islands are isolated. Spaniards brought Carolinians to these islands to help the hospitals holding patients with leprosy.

Chamorro sargento mayor Luís de Torres became an important source of information about the Carolinian people.

During this time the people built a boat called Waa (canoe) for transporting cargo and passengers over long distances.

Reports from Chamorro refugees of Spanish–Chamorro wars during the 1600s discouraged Carolinians from traveling to the Mariana Islands. They did not travel there until Carolinian navigator Luito went to Guam in 1778.

Carolinian sailors became very knowledgeable of the Marianas islands and learned that the northern islands were mostly empty of people.

In Guam, Carolinians traveled to Talofofo Bay in 1788. They were on a voyage and stopped there in search of iron. This kind of trade had not occurred in over a hundred years in Guam since the military conflicts between Spanish and Chamorros. Guam became popular with Carolinians because of the iron as well as copper and other resources.

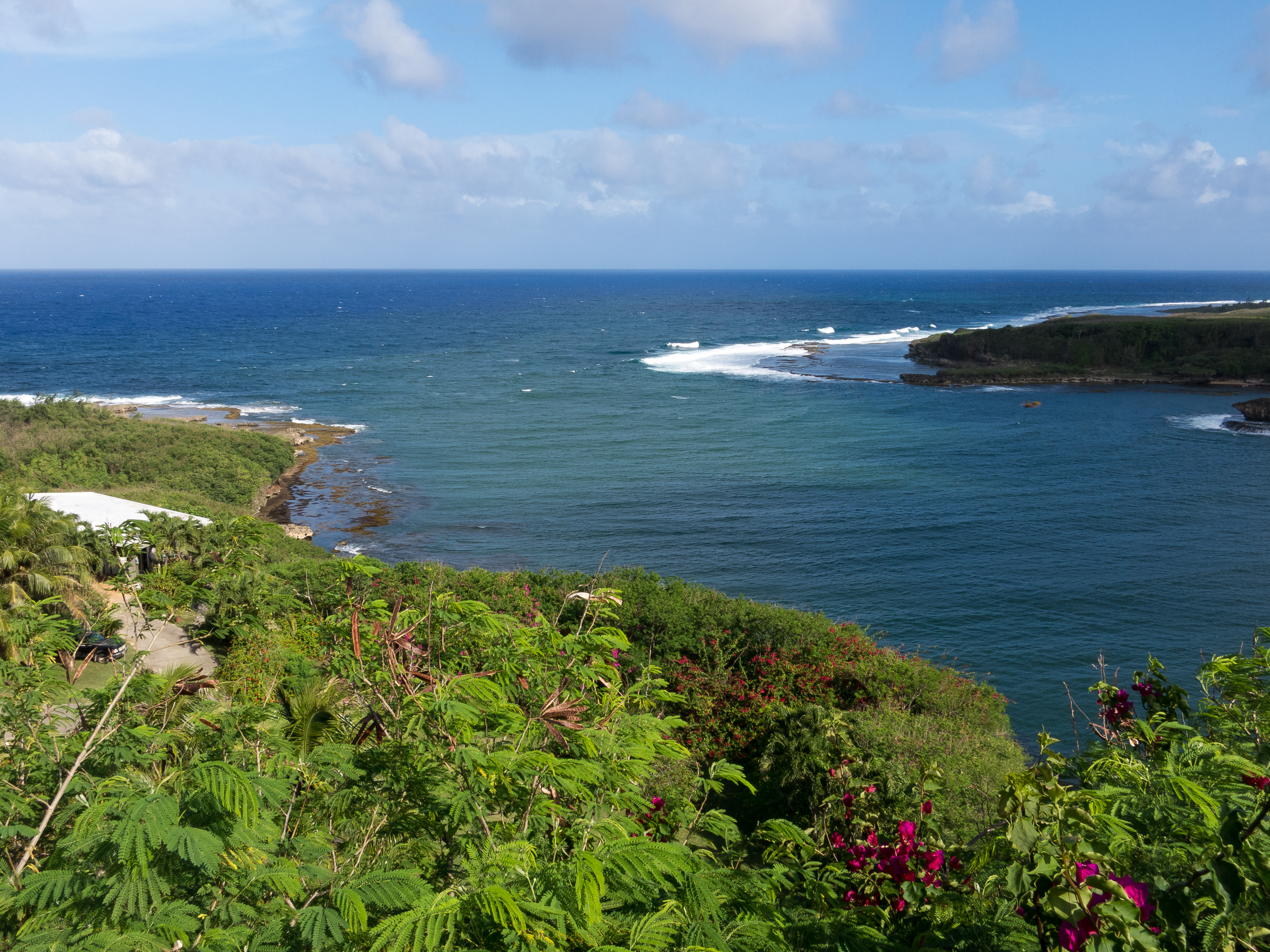
Talofofo Bay

In the 19th century the Refaluwasch moved from Elato and Satawal islands in the East and West part of the Carolinian islands to what is now Northern Mariana Islands.

During the 18th century a Catholic order called the Augustinian Recollects was given missionary work in the Mariana Islands. Before this, a religious order was already in place in the Mariana Islands. Later in the 19th century, they attended to Carolinian migrants who came to the islands.

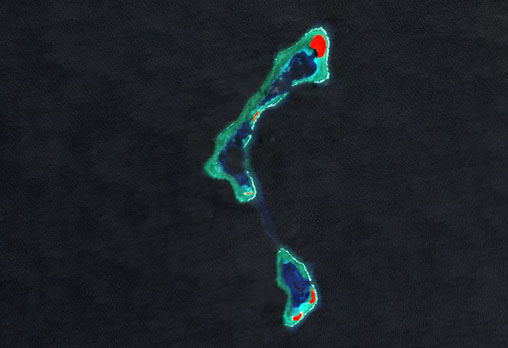
An image of Elato from outer space.

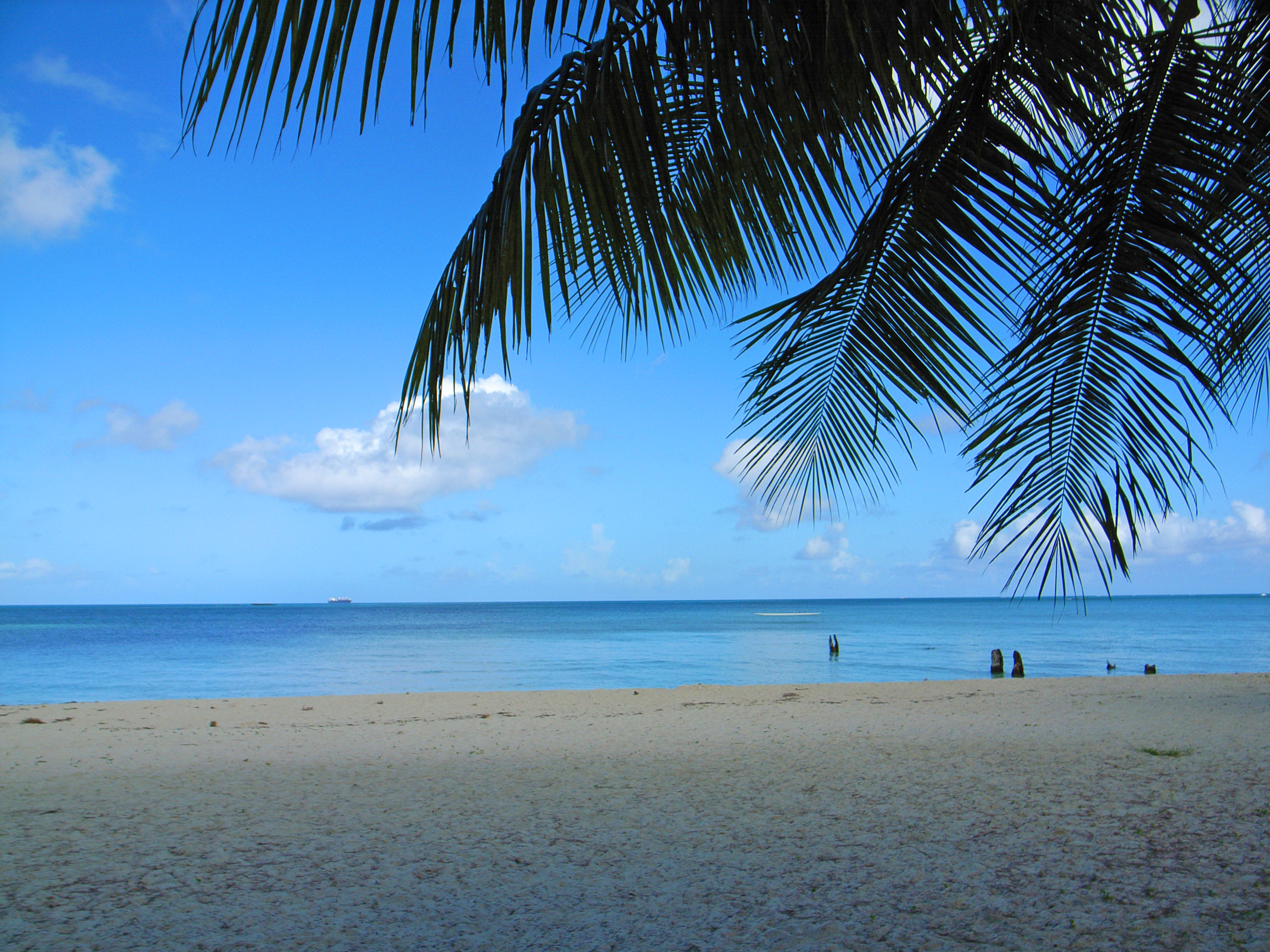
This beach is where the two chiefs came. Aghurubw loved this place.

The two islands were devastated by a typhoon, and the Refaluwasch were starving during this time. Chief Nguschul of Elato along with Chief Aghurubw of Satawal led the people to the NMI. The people traveled in 120 canoes filled with an estimated 900 people. They landed at Micro Beach. They set up the first Carolinian settlement on what is now CNMI in 1815. After coming to Saipan, they built a village called Arabwal. They tried to live like they did on the islands they left. They also kept up yearly links with their home islands. This area is now in American Memorial Park. This was not the only village built. The other one Ppiyal Oolang. This area is where Nguschul and his group settled. The villages' sites were chosen because of the sandy beaches and swamp like sites. The sites also enabled made it easy for them to access the ocean through reef passages. They were also chosen because it was fronted by a long sheltered lagoon. The swampy areas east of the beach was useful for taro cultivation. A group of Carolinians came from Lamotrek and another came from Tametam not long after and joined them. More continued to come in the 1800s, as well as to other areas such as Guam and Tinian.

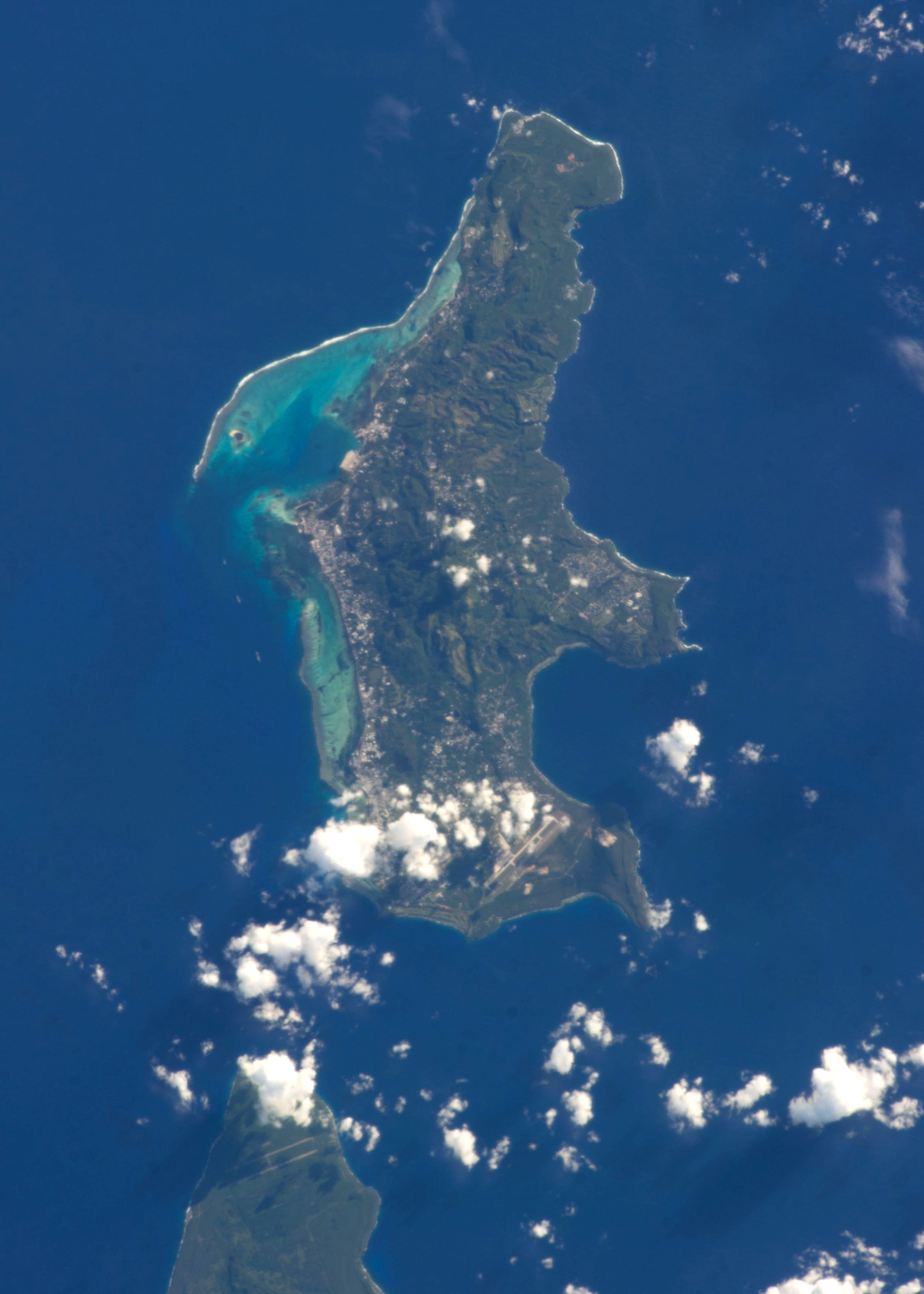
This is an aerial view of Saipan, the island the people came to after the islands were hit by the typhoon.

The Spanish allowed them to keep their culture.

During the mid-1800s, Carolinians moved to Tamuning due to an 1849 typhoon which devastated their land. They continued inter-island travel during the latter half of the 18th century and into the 19th century, using a ship called a banca.

In 1865, 265 Carolinians were transferred from the Carolines by Englishman George Johnston. He moved them to Pagan.

In 1868, a powerful typhoon hit Arabwal, causing massive damage. However, with the island's abundance of resources, the community was able to recover from it.

In 1876, the 700 Carolinians and Chamorros and 300 Europeans on Saipan had an issue with droughts which prevented them from growing food. Hunger was a great issue during this time.

The Tanapag village was set up by some Refaluwasch who left Tinian island in 1879.

By 1885, most of the desirable lands in the Northern Marianas were now under the control of the Carolinians.

In 1889, Governor Olive had the Refaluwasch on Tinian relocate to Tanapag, Saipan.

In 1893 the Emperor of Germany William II acknowledged on a least one occasion the Carolinians and Chamorros helping people who escaped a shipwreck. This was the shipwreck of a German ship called T. H. Dennis. He gave gold crosses and awards.

During the 1890s there was a court case concerning a Carolinian man named Ygajaran, who disappeared sometime in or before 1893. This case involved courts in the Marianas as well as the Philippines.

=== German period (1899–1914) ===
Spain sold the Northern Mariana Islands to Germany in 1899, after losing Guam to the United States in 1898. This area became known as the German Northern Marianas. This was the shortest period a country controlled this area. They had little impact on the culture of the Carolinians but did bring in new ways of schooling, bureaucracy, architecture, and administration. The legal system was transparent towards both Carolinians and Chamorros.

On 17 November 1899, Georg Fritz became the first district officer of this area. He set up programs which brought together the Carolinians and Chamorro people living on the islands. In 1902, on the volcanic island Anatahan, Fritz found evidence of Carolinian huts. These were used by Carolinian workers who harvested copra.

Marriages between German settlers or colonial officers and Carolinians at Saipan occurred. The marriage did not allow for citizenship for either the Carolinian partner or children. This was the same for Chamorro people.The Carolinian population in 1901 was 772. The last population count by the Germans in 1914 recorded a population of 1,109.

Unlike the Chamorros, Carolinians did not own land during this time.

=== US naval era (1899–1903) ===
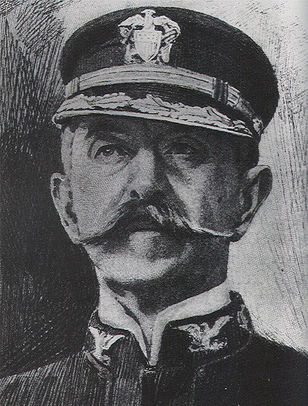
An image of former Governor Leary.

In Guam the people were made to adopt Western ways of living by the U.S. Naval Administration.

One example of this was banning nudity. In Guam the first American governor was Richard P. Leary (1899–1900), who issued an order that Carolinian women in Guam were not allowed to be naked when he visited. This was done away with by Governor William E. Sewell (1903–1904). The men were not allowed to be naked either, and many went to Saipan to avoid this. The constant nudity of the people bothered the second American governor Seaton Schroeder (1900–1903) so much that he decided to move them off the island. They were sent to CNMI through an agreement with the Germans who controlled these islands and wanted additional laborers.

=== Japanese administration and occupation (1914–1945) ===
Japan took over the Mariana Islands in 1914 and were allowed to keep it in the Treaty of Versailles.

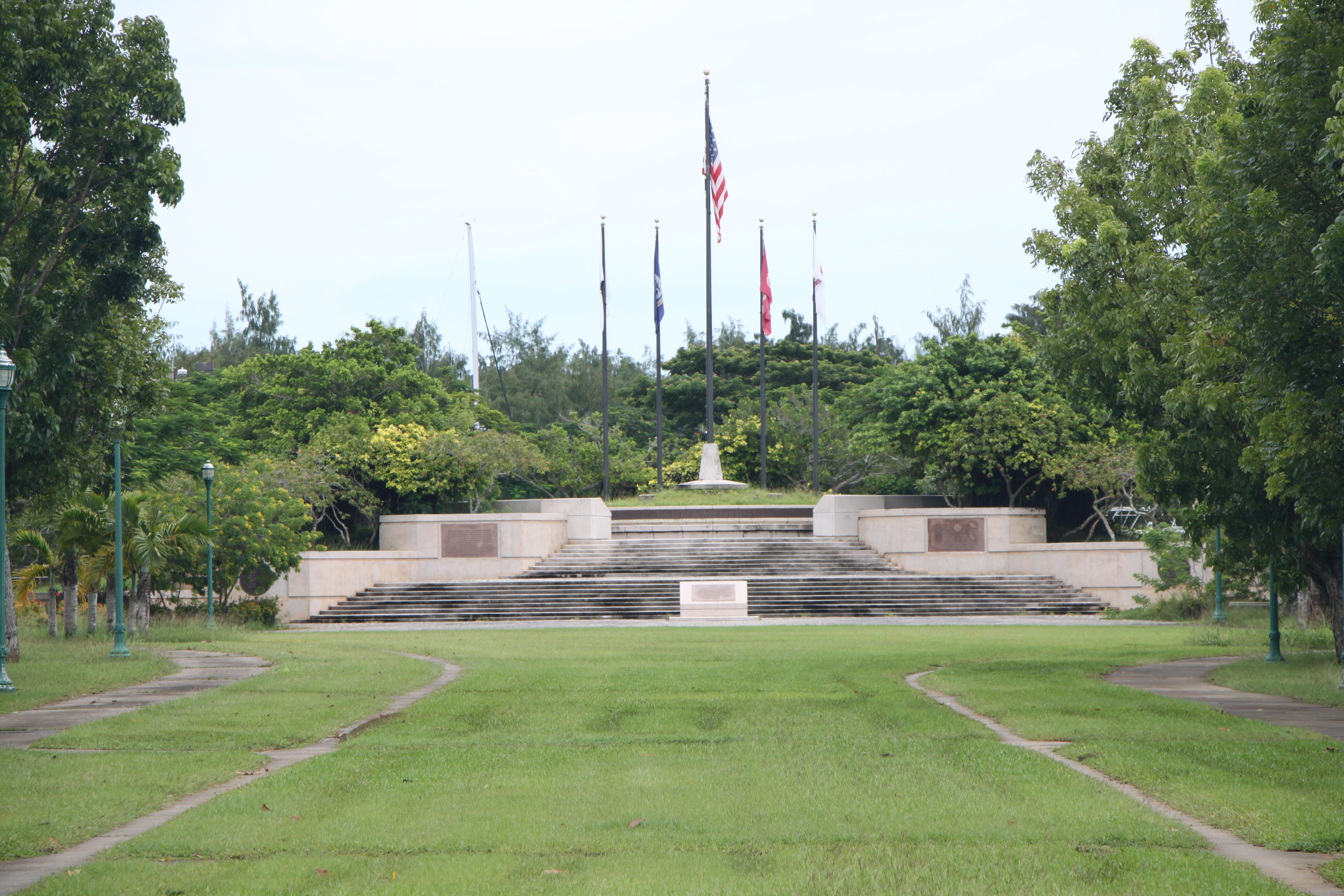
American Memorial Park is located on Saipan and is the location of Arabwal. The names of Carolinians who died during WWII are inscribed in granite panels.

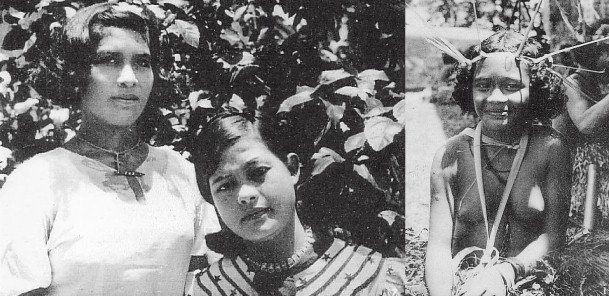
Under Japan, Carolinians in kanakas like the one on the right still practiced their culture. The fashion concerning the leaf structures was even present then.

The Carolinians had villages which the Japanese called kanakas. These villages were controlled by village chieftains called sosoncho and soncho. These chieftains did not always have this position under the traditional tribal patterns.

While the Japanese controlled these islands, they used the Carolinian people as laborers for mining and handling phosphate ore. One of the mines was in Angaur, Palau. On Saipan, in the economic system under Japan, Chamorros fared better than Carolinians. Carolinians were not treated as well as the Chamorros who worked with them. The Japanese and other colonial powers during this time (WWI-WWII) would not allow Carolinians to do canoe navigation over large distances. During this time, a term used to refer to the Micronesian people under Japanese control was 'Tomin'. Tomin meant inhabitants of the land. The Carolinian and Chamorro people viewed this term as derogatory, since the Japanese used it as a form of discrimination. The Japanese government, also known as the South Seas Government, viewed them as uncivilized and primitive. The people were kept under strict surveillance and were enslaved in 1944. During this time, a few in this indigenous community served as scouts for the U.S. Marines.

On Saipan, some Refaluwasch families were under an American military government. Some were in Camp Susupe, in a Chamorro-Carolinian area of the camp.

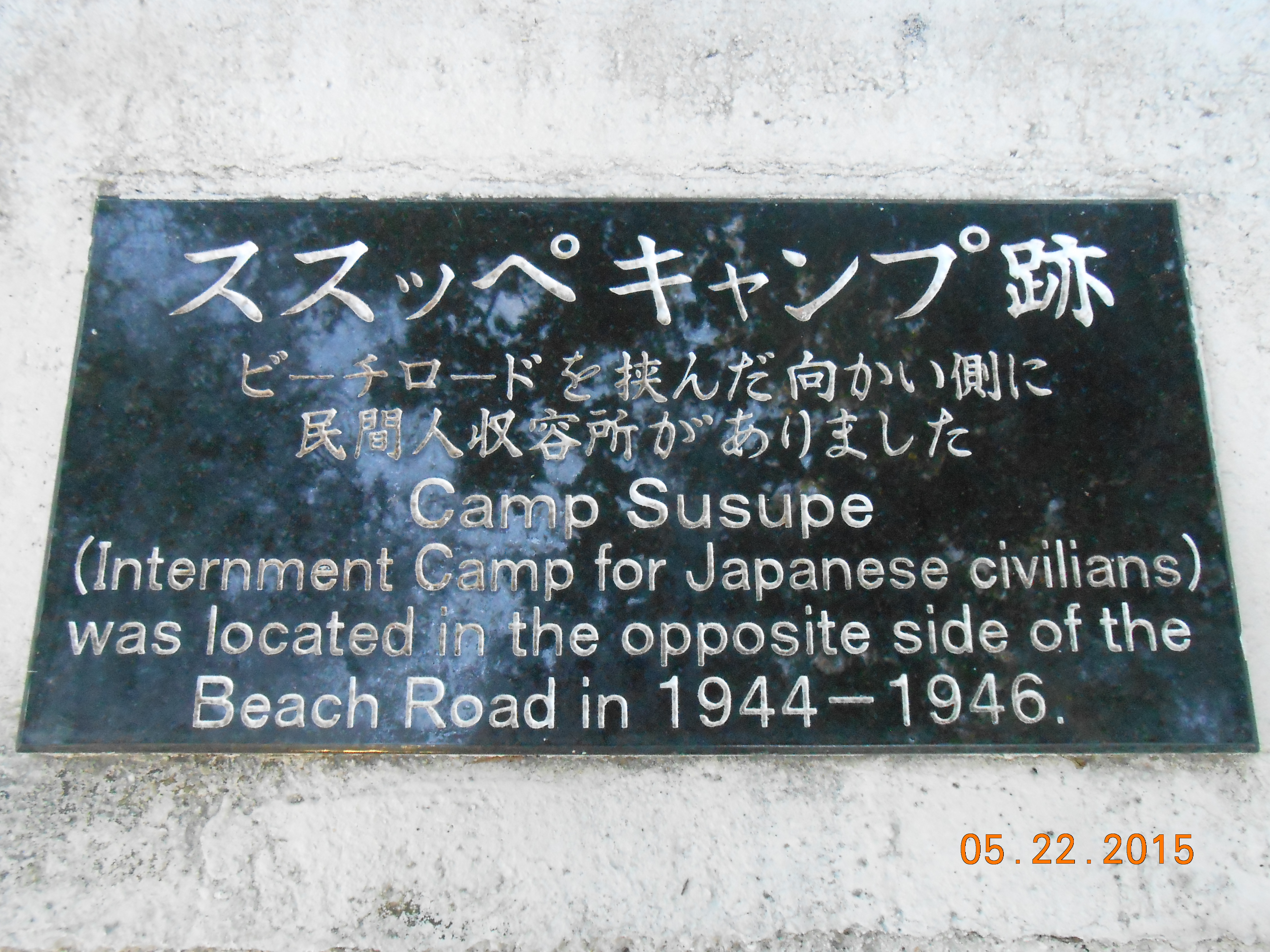
The camp was used for Refaluwasch people as well as Japanese.

Some Refaluwasch were restricted from returning to their lands during this occupation. One of the reasons they were interned was that the United States government wanted them to learn English, as well as American political and social life. They were allowed to farm and fish before the evening and had to return to the camp when night came.

During the battle of Saipan in 1944, Carolinians set up underground bunkers to protect themselves and their families from Japanese and American soldiers. They buttressed these bunkers with coconut logs, which would not be noticed by the Japanese and Americans.

On Saipan during April 1945, there were 810 Refaluwasch on the island. Later in September of that year, more Refaluwasch were brought into Saipan.

After the Japanese surrender, Refaluwasch were allowed to return to their lands.

=== Post-World War II (1945–2000) ===
The people did not object to the edicts of the U.S. military authorities. They were thankful for the basic necessities provided by Naval Military Government. The authorities founded a police force consisting of Carolinians and Chamorros for Camp Susupe and Chalan Kanoa. It was called Native Police and was 87 strong.

Under the Naval Military Government, some Carolinian families adopted children of Korean or Japanese descent who were orphaned because of WWII.

==== Efforts to reunify the Marianas & service ====
After World War II, there have been efforts to reunify the Marianas. In 1961, the Carolinian community submitted a resolution opposing reunification. In 1969, the community was interested in a freely associated state consisting of the Northern Marianas Islands. The Northern Marianas Carolinians desired stronger connections with Carolinians in Micronesia.

Carolinian people served in the Vietnam War. Fewer than 100 of them are known.

=== Early 21st century ===
Before 2004, the Carolinians and Chamorro people were competing with each other before banding together. This is sometimes called Chamolinian. They did this to challenge what they call outsiders, Filipinos and Japanese people, among other groups of migrants.

As of 2018, Refaluwasch in the Marianas have one of the highest rates of service in the U.S. military.

In 2018, former Acting Governor of Northern Mariana Islands Victor Hocog signed a proclamation to make September Chamorro and Carolinian Heritage Month and to establish Chief Aghurubw Day.

==== Resistance to U.S. militarization ====
Although there are high rates of service for the U.S. military in this community, there has also been resistance to it. Refaluwasch women have used digital, legal, political, and spiritual methods to resist a military buildup in the Marianas Archipelago, including lawsuits supported by the National Environmental Policy Act (NEPA) against the Department of Defense (DoD) and Department of the Navy.

== Population ==
In the Mariana islands in 1727, the population of Carolinians was 3, two males and one female.

On Saipan in 1869, the population was 331.

Tinian in 1884 had a population of 231 consisting of Carolinians and Chamorros. Carolinians are the majority. Rota in the same year had an indigenous population of 499 consisting of Chamorros and Carolinians. In what was then called Agana there was a total population of 6126 aside from the Europeans. On Saipan the 760 indigenous consisted partly of Carolinians.

In 1911 on Saipan, the population is 1,211; on Pagan, their population was 95; and on Agrigan, their population was 18.

In 1946 on Saipan, the population was 1,047. There were 355 adult males, 307 adult females, 209 male children, and 176 female children.

According to a Native Census for Quarter Ending 31 March 1948, there were 1,072 people on Saipan. There were 253 males under 16, 304 males under 16, 224 females under 16, and 291 females over 16.

On Guam in 1953, there were less than 150 Carolinians.

The population in 1999 on the CNMI was 3,500.

Due to Compact of Free Association, the Carolinian population has increased greatly on Guam. As of the 2000 U.S., census the population is around 11,000.

Chamorros and Carolinians make up less than half of the people on CNMI. They are 4.6% of the population on CNMI. According to the 2010 American FactFinder profile on CNMI, the Carolinians number over 2,400. In Saipan, they are 20% of the population. The population in the United States has increased significantly. Outside the CNMI and Guam, in the United States, Washington state has the largest Carolinian population, with 127 people. 116 of them live in Seattle. Concerning age, 40% of the people in this group are under 18 years old, while only 2% are over 65.

According to the 2015 census, there are 361 Carolinians on Palau, 2% of its population.

== Economics ==
During the late 1990s, Carolinians were estimated to have 20% unemployment. Also during this time, they were behind the Chamorros in terms of economics.

In 2005 on the island of Saipan, 2% of employed workers were Carolinians.

According to the 2010 U.S. census, the Carolinian people, along with other Micronesian groups, have lower rates of homeownership than other ethnic groups in the country. They are mainly renters, with only 14% owning homes.

== Politics ==
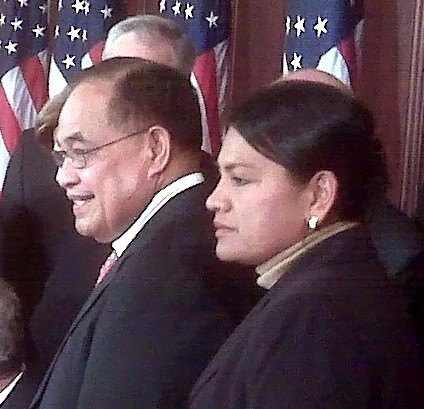
A picture of the former governor Fitial and his wife Josie Fitial.

=== Term(s) ===
Tamor is a word for Carolinian Chief.

In what is now Guam Carolinians in María Cristina a dependent district they were led by a teniente de justica (elected municipal officer). They elected a cabeza that assisted the municipal officer.

=== Other political info and political figures ===
There have been efforts to bring the Marianas together. In the 1960s people submitted a resolution against putting the Marianas under one government. The Carolinians in the Northern Marianas desired stronger ties with Refaluwasch abroad in Micronesia. A lot of them wanted CNMI to be freely associated with the U.S.

The Carolinian population is represented in the legislature; however, the Chamorro people are dominant in politics.

Alfonso Aluput was a tamor of the pueblo (town) on the island of Tinian in the 1880s. He was chief of the Carolinian settlers. He was also a cabeza of baranguay (head of a barrio unit) on Tinian. He asked for a priest and school teacher, since it was hard for individuals to travel from Tinian to Saipan.

José Ogomuro Aitao was appointed teniente of the Carolinians in the pueblo of Saipan during the 1890s. He was a gobernadorcillo. He was a capitanes after being a gobernadorcillo. Capitanes are former gobernadorcillos who are given certain rights and privileges.

Vicente Saralú was a gobernadorcillo in the 1800s. He was gobernadorcillo of Saipan during the biennial term 1876–1877. He lost an election in 1891 to Juan de León Guerrero for the same seat.

Elias Parung Sablan became Mayor of Saipan in 1945.

Benigno R. Fitial (1945– ) became the CNMI's first governor of Carolinian descent.

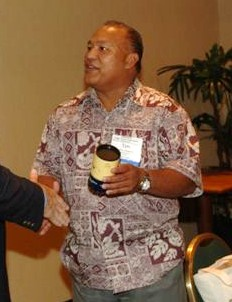
Picture of Villagomez.

Lieutenant Governor Timothy P. Villagomez served under Fitial.

Cinta Kaipat served in CNMI House of Representatives in the 15th CNMI Legislature.

Joseph James Norita Camacho was a member of 16th CNMI House of Representatives and held the position of House Floor Leader. He was elected to this position in 2007.

In the Obama administration, a Refaluwasch women named Rellani Bennett Ogumoro served as the Policy Advisor for the Domestic Policy Council. Before this she was named 2011 Truman Scholar. She received the Eastern Oregon University (EOU) Student Award.

== Culture ==
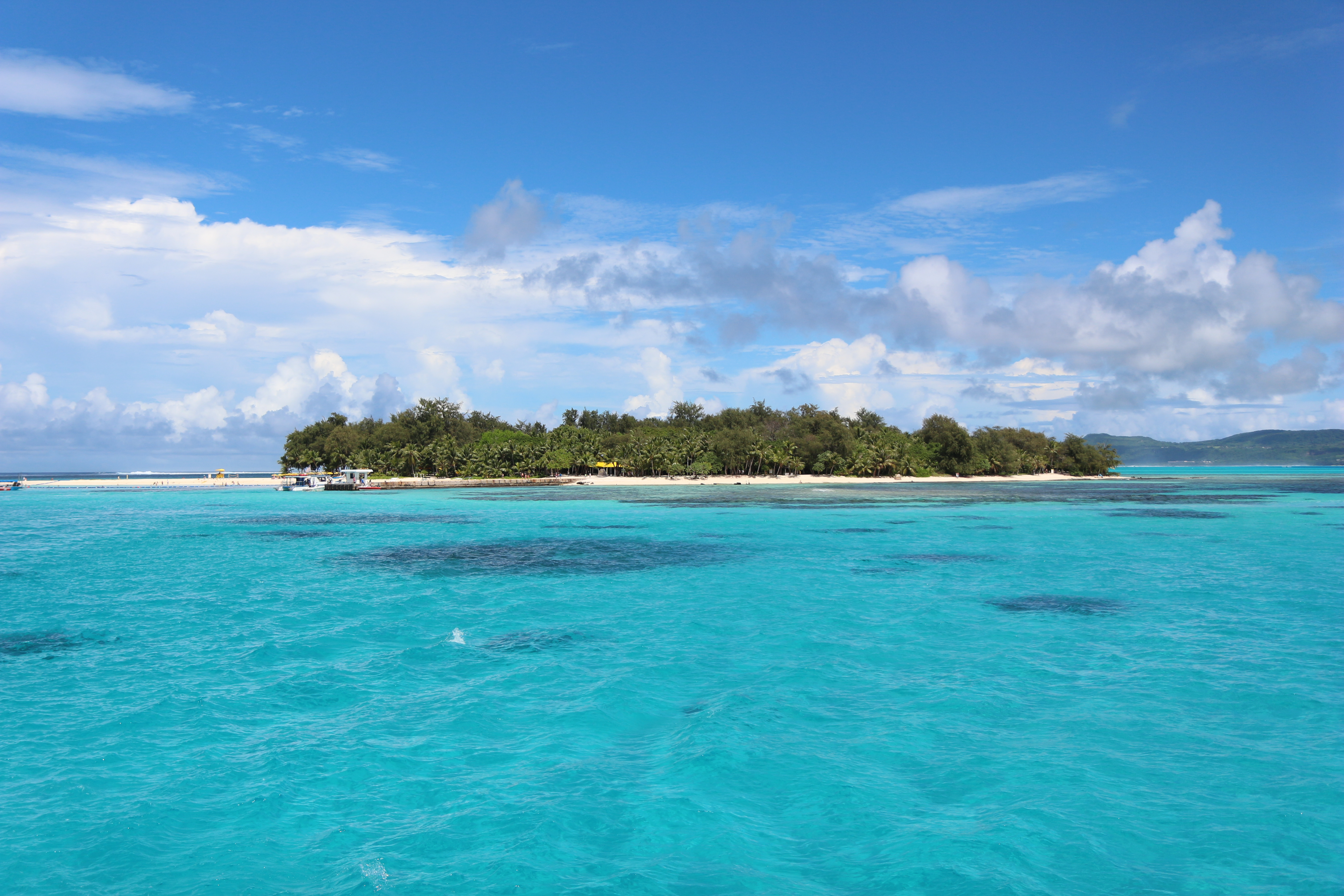
View of a portion of Managaha Island.

Carolinian culture originated from the islands Yap and Chuuk in what is now the Federated States of Micronesia. The present day generation as of 2010 has less respect for the culture in addition to the chiefs who push them. The culture has been influenced by others who reside in CNMI.

The Managaha Island is sacred in Refaluwasch culture due to the fact Chief Aghurubw is buried there.

Much like the Chamorro people, respect is very important to their culture. They also historically place an emphasis on solidarity, or tipiyeew.

The Refaluwasch have respect for elders of any economic background and education level.

Mwei-mwei is a Refaluwasch way of adopting children, usually initiated and done between familial wives. The children are usually adopted as infants but can be as old as eleven. The biological parents must give permission. After adoption, the adoptive parents treat the child(ren) as their own in all situations.

=== Dance ===
The Refaluwasch have two different dances based on gender. The men's dance is called "Maas". They also do a stick dance. The women's dance is "Bwaay", a slow dance. In certain men's dances, they wear large leaves around their necks (ubwuut) and a traditional bead called "Lighatuttur" or "Usos". They also wear coconut leaves fashioned into a crown. The dance was originally for warriors but spread to other men after the Refaluwasch came to the Mariana Islands.

=== Traditional dress, art, and body art ===
==== Body art ====
Carolinian women and men have their own tattoos. The women have tattoos on their calves, while the men have tattoos on their thighs, buttocks, arms, back of neck, and lower back.

==== Art ====
The Refaluwasch painted symbols on their sails.

=== Death ===
When a person dies, the body is covered with sweet-smelling flowers and vines. The body is rolled up into pandanus mat. At the right time, women place the body on the water and move it to the edge of a particular reef. They put weights on the person and place them in the current, which takes the body out to the ocean.

In Refaluwasch culture, places called Fiirourow are used to deal with people who died. These are ancestral villages and places where the Refaluwasch go to burn the belongings of loved ones. The places are located in the reefs.

==== After death and spirits ====
As of the 1950s, it is considered disrespectful to say a deceased person's name in front of relatives of the deceased. This may still be the case in the 21st century.

Sometimes, the body is burned and the ashes are 'returned' to the ocean. In other cases, the skull is put in a sacred place. This is done for spiritual reasons.

In Refaluwasch history, up to the 1950s, there was, and may still be, a strong belief in ghosts. There are two types of ghost: alü luwal and alü leim. The alü luwal were thought to possibly be ghosts of the ancients. The alü luwal are the ghosts of the people that died recently and those known to be deceased. These spirits can cause harm, such as illness, to the living. During this time, most Carolinians believed magic was used to treat disease and deal with the harm these spirits bring. Thus, the damage these spirits can inflict are limited by medicine men.

=== Water ===
The water around the Northern Mariana Islands has been integral to these people. They have respect for and connection to the sea. In Carolinian culture, men would go out and get food for women to prepare. The women would clean and scale fish. The Refaluwasch have celestial navigation skills. Part of this was a triangulation method called etak (moving islands). They share a common ancient origin and seafaring navigation achievements with the Native Hawaiians and Chamorro people.

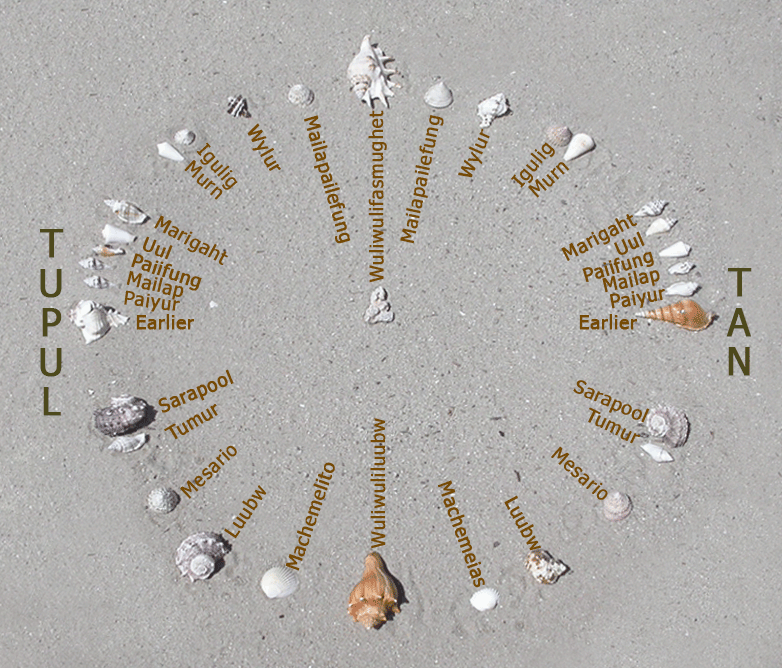
This star compass was made by Mau Piailug. This is part of his Carolinian navigational system.

=== Carolinian customary law ===
Under this law, property can be owned by one person or a whole family. The CNMI Code says family land should be held for the equal enjoyment of all members.

Traditional Carolinian land tenure involves women. Land was passed down from mother to daughter, and the land was owned and controlled by women. The oldest woman in the maternal line with the longest held title would be a "trustee" for the rest of the lineage members.

In 2005 Commonwealth Code said family land can be got at least one Carolinian ancestor.

== Food ==
Subsistence agriculture to get food was how these people lived from 1815 to 1914 in the CNMI.

In 1840, visitors saw the people on Saipan living off fish, turtles, taro, and yam.

Seafood makes up a big part of their meat dishes. They have a history of fishing for thousands of years. Fishing trips are not just for feeding a small group of people but also for annual village parties, baptisms and confirmations, marriages, and other special celebrations. After fish are caught, some may be given to the fisherman's wife's family members, as well as others.

In the past palu (navigators) brought food from the sea. They were respected.

Payúr, Refaluwasch for mackerel scad, is a fish that is caught using a poiu (fishing stone). Poiu consists of a limestone spherical sinker, smoothed into the shape of an egg with holes put into it. After this, an inverted half coconut shell that is the same size or slightly smaller is connected with a cordage. Half of the coconut is filled with mashed or ground meat from a young coconut. This is similar to churn and is done to draw fish to it. The whole device is tied using a longer cord that is 50–60 feet in length. The cord is very long so that the poiu can be lowered into deeper water. The poiu is set down on the sea bed before being moved closer to the surface over the course of a month. The Payúr that reach the surface are eventually gathered using a scoop net.

One of the ways they prepare food involves using an uumw, a traditional underground oven in which food is roasted.

== Language ==
The Refaluwasch language is a Chuukic language. The language has different versions. Refaluwasch is one of the official languages in the CNMI.

Written records of this language date back to the late 1700s.

The language is spoken widely on Northern Marianas Islands among Carolinians.

== Religion ==
=== Traditional religion(s) ===
Despite the Catholic faith, many Carolinians use land to talk to their ancestors. Land in their culture is not just property; it is a spiritual matter. The place is where people can talk to their ancestors as well as collect unique properties for healing and teach traditions to future generations.

In their traditional religion(s) they have animas, spiritual ancestors of the CNMI.

The ocean is also of spiritual significance. According to some, it is spiritually central to Carolinian Indigeneity.

Before the Spanish brought Catholicism, there was a religion worshipping a supreme being called Yalafar. This religion also involved an individual called Can, who is a bad spirit.

After an individual dies, in certain cases, their skull is kept because some believe the spirit of the late relative can visit their family when necessary. The living have great respect for the dead. In Carolinian traditional religion(s), spirits of the dead can help or hurt the living. It is also believed that since the spirit world is the source of all things in this world, everything that lives or is real must be respected. Things contain spirits, which go by different names such as ghosts, taotaomo'na, and white ladies, among other names.

Carolinians had a system called sawei. They would bring materials (offerings) to their "fathers" in exchange for "spiritual protection". One reason people brought offerings was because of Yapese magicians who were believed to have power over the weather.

The stick dance has a religious origin in Chuuk. It is claimed that a spirit taught this centuries ago during a war between two clans. The dance began as a way of fighting.

=== Roman Catholicism ===
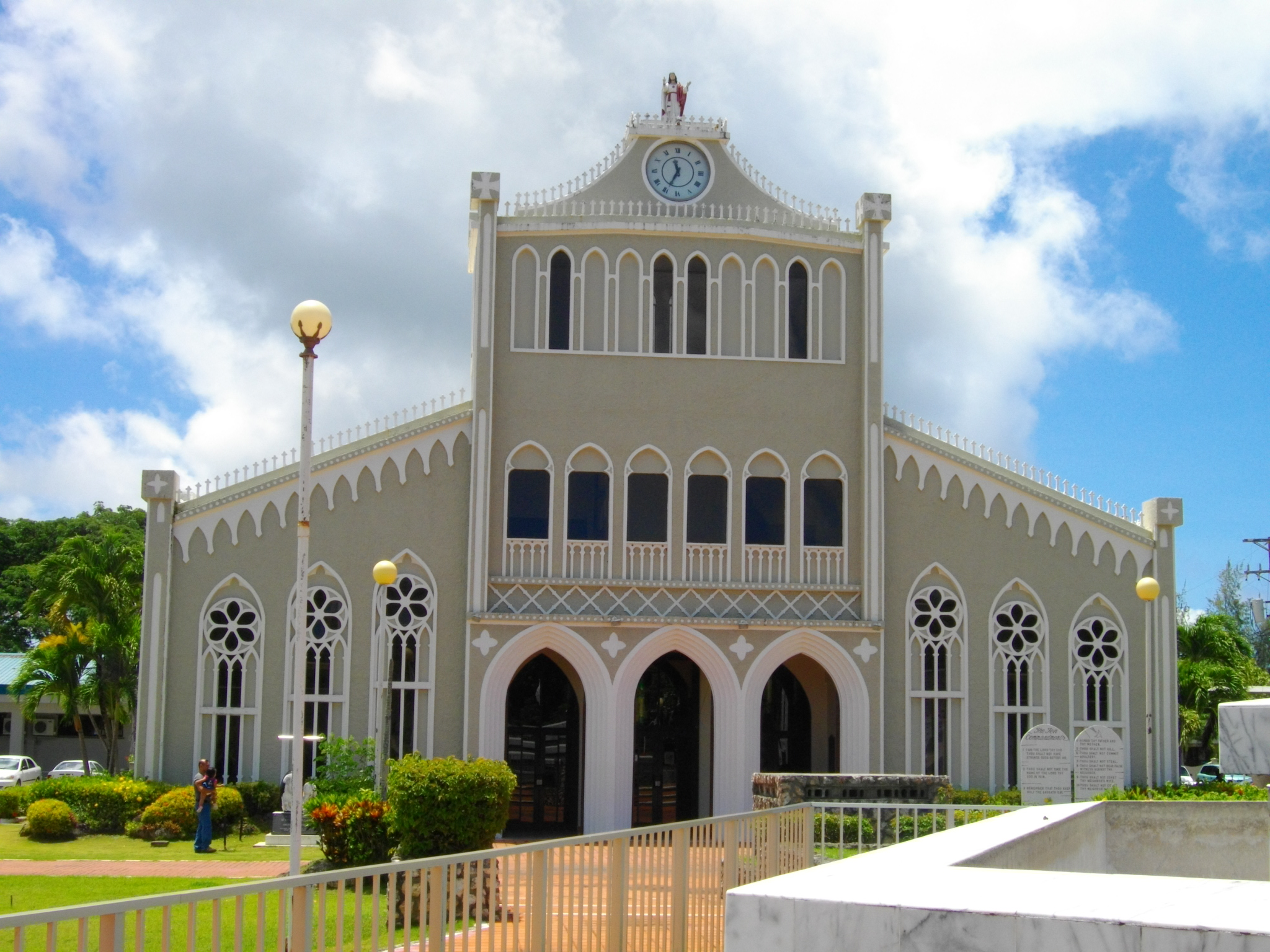
This is an entrance to the Our Lady of Mount Carmel Cathedral Parish. The parish says this place represents the strength of the Carolinian and Chamorro people in terms of family and spirit.

Roman Catholicism dominates in Refaluwasch societies. Due to Spanish missionary influence, they also use rosaries and novenas.

Efforts to bring Christianity to these people began with Father Paul Klein during the 1600s. One of the people to bring Catholicism to them was Father Juan Antonio Cantova in the early 1700s.

In 1819, a group of Carolinians was told to accept Christianity before moving to Saipan. The agreement (which included other things) was authorized by officials in Manila.

== Family, gender, and health ==
=== Family ===
Under German administration, de facto marriages happened between German settlers or colonial officers and Carolinians on Saipan. These marriages did not involve marriage certificates. They were "Micronesian marriages" and did not lead to citizenship for the Carolinians or the children resulting from the marriage.

Carolinian families under the Naval Military Government adopted Japanese and Korean war orphans.

The usual Western family structure has been used by Carolinians, but many communities still use the matrilineal social setup.

Domestic violence against women may have been an issue in the latter 1800s in María Cristina, according to former Mariana Islands governor Luis Santos. In 1999, domestic violence was said to be widespread. Women are expected to treat male relatives with respect when they are present.

In Refaluwasch language, there is a term of endearment, nemin, used by men when referring to their partners.

=== Gender ===
In Refaluwasch culture, there are rigid gender divisions.

When a male relative is in the same room, a woman may make herself lower than him. They may even get down on their hands and knees and crawl to where they have to go.

Utt (pronounced "oot") is a meeting house where men congregate. They would also construct canoes in these places. In Garapan, there is Carolinian Utt, where people can play sports. It is also used as a community center.

=== Health ===
The Managaha Island is a sacred place and has been used to harvest medicinal plants.

According to the Asia-Pacific Journal of Public Health, diabetes was more common among Carolinians in the 1990s.

In 1999, drug abuse, alcoholism, and obesity were significant issues. The main drug was crystal methamphetamine, which was introduced to CNMI in 1989. The drug was perceived to be destroying the family values of Carolinians.

The people are at an extremely high risk of cervical and breast cancer. According to the Division of Public Health in 2005, 88.9 out of 100,000 people from 25 to 34 years old gets cervical cancer. In the 35–44 age group, it is 49.4 out of every 100,000. In the 45–54 group, it is 40 per 100,000.

An article in Preventing Chronic Disease discussed births among Pacific Islanders in the CNMI. In the CNMI, Carolinian mothers have a much higher risk of having premature births than Chinese mothers. They are also more likely to have babies with macrosomia than Filipino moms. Out of all births from 2007 to 2014, this group is having the most children at 33.2%. Teenage pregnancy is more common among Carolinians and other Pacific Islanders than among other groups. In the mid-2000s to 2009 there was an increase from 7 to 12 at first, then a decrease, before a larger increase to 18 in 2009. They also have issues with obesity, cholesterol, and diabetes. CNMI Pacific Islanders have comparatively higher rates of engaging in unhealthy actions such as using tobacco, chewing betel nut, and consuming alcohol. The chewing of betel nut contributes to preterm birth rates.

== Media representation ==
The Refaluwasch have little to no presence in films. Most films have white people in speaking roles. Pacific Islanders in Hollywood, according to report from USC, only make up a fraction of the actors and actresses in film in recent years.

They also have little to no presence in television. Pacific Islanders make up a fraction of the characters on prime time television. They make up just 0.2% of acting roles in which the character appears regularly. More than 64% of series as of 2017 did not feature a Pacific Islander or Asian American regularly. Their white counterparts usually get three times the screentime they get in the same program.

Comic strips in the early 20th century and 19th century had little to no female Refaluwasch, whether they be cartoonists or minor characters.

== Notable people ==
Luito also known as Luwito (date of birth unknown–disappeared in 1789) was a Carolinian navigator of Lamotrek. He was able to reach Guam using charts that contained the directions to the island. Guam was known as "Waghal" on Lamotrek and other areas. On his return from the second voyage to Guam, his group separated into two before a storm destroyed their voyage in 1789.

Chief Aghurubw (1700s-1800s) of the Ghatoliyool clan and chief of Satawal brought the Refaluwasch in Satawal to CNMI in 1815.

Chief Nguschul (1700s–1800s) of Elato (a coral reef atoll consisting of three islands) brought his group to what is now CNMI in 1815 and named a village Ppiyal Oolang, which in English means "beach view sky." Oral tradition may imply that he lived into old age before dying on Elato.

Kadu (late 1700s–1800s) was a Woleaian navigator and Chief under King Toua. He was an emissary traveling on sea under his King until 1814. He and his associates were blown off course to the Marshall Islands. He was a castaway discover in the Marshalls in 1815 by a Captain named Otto von Kotzebue. He gave Kotzebue information on the Caroline Islands.

King Toua (1700s–1800s) was chief of the Yap Outer Island Woleai atoll. He became king in 1800, according to Captain Kotzebue of the Kotzebue voyage. He came to Guam to get iron through trade in the very early 1800s. In 1851, he sought to advance himself using people in the Northern Islands.

Former Mayor Elias Parong Sablan (1900–1968) was a chief and mayor in the Northern Mariana Islands. He became second mayor of Saipan in 1945 and served three four-year terms until 1957. He was also Judge of Saipan's Community Court, Chairman of Saipan's Board of Education, Chief of Police, and member of Congress. He also owned a grocery store.

Benusto Rogolifoi Kaipat (1930 or 1931–1991), also known as Dr. Kaipat, was a Carolinian leader and the first Carolinian doctor. He cofounded the Territorial Party in 1957. He was the first cousin of Herman Rogolifoi Guerrero, who was a politician on the CNMI. He was part of a clan called Rogolifoi.

David Mangarero Sablan aka Uncle Dave (1932–) is a prominent business leader on the CNMI. His father was Elias Parong Sablan. He was born on Garapan Saipan. He started his business career in 1952 with Atkins, Kroll & Company. He worked for nearly 40 years in business before retiring in 1987 from a position in company named Microl. He was also involved in politics in different ways, such as economic advisor for former CNMI Governor Tenorio and was active in the 1981 election for CNMI governor, among other political activities.

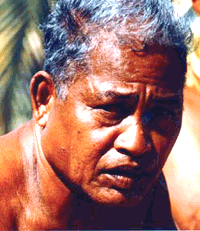
Picture of Piailug in his latter years.

Mau Piailug (1932–2010) was a master navigator involved in using non-instrument wayfinding.

Felix F. Rabauliman (1934–1996) was a part of Marianas Political Status Commission. He was also part of the Saipan municipal government. In the 1960s, he was a teacher teaching grades 1st to 6th. His clan is called Mongofasch. The name of his wife's clan is Umma.

Jose Rebuenog Lifoifoi Sr. (1936–2020) was a politician in the CNMI government serving in the Legislature. Before this he worked in the Trust Territory government. He started in 1962 in the office of Procurement and Supply. In the legislature, he was the fifth speaker of the House of Representatives. He was also the chairman of the United Micronesia Development Association and chairman of the Commonwealth Ports Authority's board of directors. He also had a job as the Republic of Palau's honorary consul to the Northern Marianas Islands.

Larry Saralu was one of the most famous singers in the early post-World-War-II years. He was Saipanese-Carolinian.

Lino (Urushemeyoung) Mettao Olopai (1940–) was responsible for maintaining the Carolinian culture.

Benigno Repeki Fitial (1945–) became the first Carolinian governor of CNMI in 2006 and served until 2013. During this time he was a member of the U.S. Republican Party.

Candy Taman (1948–) is a Chamorro-Carolinian recording artist who made Chamorro and Carolinian music. He formed a band called Local Breed with Frank "Bokonggo" Pangelinan. He would later rename it Tropocisette. He pioneered Chamorro music on CNMI.

Felicidad Taman Ogumoro (1949–2024) was a member of the First Commonwealth Legislature and cofounder of Western Pacific Associates. She was one of the first two women in the Northern Marianas Commonwealth Legislature. In Micronesian culture, she has changed the idea of traditional roles for males and females. She also became vice speaker of House of Representatives on the CNMI.

Jacinta (Libwaischibw) "Cinta" Matagolai Kaipat (17 August 1961 – 22 February 2023) was the first Refaluwasch woman to become a lawyer. She was born in Agrighan, Northern Mariana Islands.

Felipe I. Ruak (1961 or 1962–) is an artistic director of a stick dancing group called the Talabwog Man Stick Dancers, a traditional Refaluwasch group in Saipan. His son, Joseph K. Ruak, is an artistic director of the group. He is from the Tanapag Village.

Melvin L. O. Faisao is the executive director of the Chamorro-Carolinian Language Policy Commission. He was a representative in the Northern Marianas Commonwealth Legislature in the latter 90s. Before he was executive director of the commission he was a secretary in the Department of Community and Cultural Affairs.

Isidro "Sid" Ogumoro is the earliest known Carolinian who became a Catholic deacon. His birth date is 4 November. He is now Parish Administrator of the San Roque Parish in Saipan.

Gordon Ichihara Marciano (1967–) is a tour company director of Pacific Development Inc. He is also Chamorro and Japanese.

Joseph James Norita Camacho became the first Carolinian judge in CNMI. He became a judge in 2011.

Oston Saralu is a Chamorro/Carolinian/Palauan‐American singer.

Sarilyn Ogumoro Escobar became the first Carolinian to be a commissioned officer in the U.S. Navy.

Luella Marciano became the resident executive of the NMI Indigenous Affairs Office in 2024.

Paseva Kumiko Leisaramfuu Itibus Ngotel (2008 – Present) is a Carolinian student from the Northern Mariana Islands who participated in the Close Up civic education program's visit to the congressional office of Representative Kimberlyn King-Hinds in Washington, D.C., in May 2025, received Kagman High School's Principal's Award in 2026, and completed an IC3 Digital Literacy certification in 2025.
