= Global Health Promotion =

- Discipline: Public health
- Language: English, French, Spanish
- Edited by: Suzanne Jackson

Publication details
- Former names: Promotion & Education
- History: 1994-present
- Publisher: SAGE Publications
- Frequency: Quarterly
- Impact factor: 2.066 (2021)

Standard abbreviations
- ISO 4: Glob. Health Promot.

Indexing
- ISSN: 1757-9759 (print); 1756-3976 (web)
- LCCN: 2009243376
- OCLC no.: 699251507

Links
- Journal homepage; Online access; Online archive

Global Health Promotion is a quarterly peer-reviewed public health journal that covers health promotion and health education. The editor-in-chief is Suzanne Jackson (University of Toronto). It was established in 1994 and is currently published by SAGE Publications on behalf of International Union for Health Promotion and Education.

== Abstracting and indexing ==
According to the Journal Citation Reports, 2021 impact factor was 2.066, ranking it 128 out of 136 journals in the category "Public, Environmental & Occupational Health (SSCI)"
