= WISN =

WISN may refer to:

- WISN-TV, a television station (channel 28, virtual 12) licensed to Milwaukee, Wisconsin, United States
- WISN (AM), a radio station (1130 AM) licensed to Milwaukee, Wisconsin, United States
- Workload Indicators of Staffing Needs (WISN), a tool for human resources planning in the health care sector
