= Eastern Mediterranean Health Journal =

- Discipline: Public health
- Language: English, French, Arabic
- Edited by: Hanan H. Balkhy

Publication details
- History: 1995–present
- Publisher: World Health Organization
- Frequency: Monthly
- Impact factor: 2.1 (2022)

Standard abbreviations
- ISO 4: East. Mediterr. Health J.

Indexing
- CODEN: EMHJAM
- ISSN: 1687-1634 (print); 1687-1634 (web)
- LCCN: sn97034804
- OCLC no.: 37952670

Links
- Journal homepage; Online archive

The Eastern Mediterranean Health Journal is a healthcare journal published by the Eastern Mediterranean Regional office of World Health Organization of the World Health Organization. It covers research in the area of public health and related biomedical or technical subjects, with particular relevance to the Eastern Mediterranean region. It was established in 1995 and articles are in Arabic, English, or French.

== Scope ==
The Eastern Mediterranean region, as covered by the journal, includes Afghanistan, Bahrain, Djibouti, Egypt, Islamic Republic of Iran, Iraq, Jordan, Kuwait, Lebanon, Libyan Arab Jamahiriya, Morocco, Oman, Pakistan, Palestine, Qatar, Saudi Arabia, Somalia, South Sudan, Sudan, Syrian Arab Republic, Tunisia, United Arab Emirates, and Yemen.

== Abstracting and indexing ==
The journal is abstracted and indexed in:

- Index Medicus / MEDLINE
- Science Citation Index Expanded / Web of Knowledge
- Social Sciences Citation Index
- CINAHL
- CAB International
- Embase
- Scopus
- LexisNexis

It is registered on the Cochrane Collaboration master journal list.

== See also ==
- Eastern Mediterranean Regional office of World Health Organization
- Bulletin of the World Health Organization
- Human Resources for Health
- Pan American Journal of Public Health
- World Health Report
