= Pan American Journal of Public Health =

- Discipline: Public health
- Language: English, Portuguese, Spanish

Publication details
- Former name(s): Bulletin of the Pan American Health Organization
- History: 1997–present
- Publisher: Pan American Health Organization
- Frequency: Monthly
- Open access: Yes
- Impact factor: 0.539 (2016)

Standard abbreviations
- ISO 4: Pan Am. J. Public Health

Indexing
- CODEN: RPSPFQ
- ISSN: 1020-4989 (print); 1680-5348 (web)
- LCCN: 97655593
- OCLC no.: 36421075

Links
- Journal homepage; Online access; Journal archives

The Pan American Journal of Public Health (Spanish: Revista Panamericana de Salud Pública; Portuguese: Revista Pan-Americana de Saúde Pública) is a peer-reviewed open-access public health journal covering research and case studies on issues of public health significance, mainly in areas related to national and local health systems, to improve the health of the peoples of the Americas. The journal is published monthly by the Pan American Health Organization, a regional office of the World Health Organization. Articles are published in English, Portuguese, and Spanish.

== Abstracting and indexing ==
The journal is abstracted and indexed in PubMed, SciELO, Web of Science, Social Sciences Citation Index, Current Contents/Social & Behavioral Sciences, EMBASE, Global Health, Tropical Diseases Bulletin, Nutrition Abstracts and Reviews, Abstracts on Hygiene and Communicable Diseases, and Review of Medical and Veterinary Entomology. According to the Journal Citation Reports, the journal has a 2016 impact factor of 0.539.

== History ==
The journal was established in 1997. It was preceded by the Boletín Panamericano de Sanidad, established in 1922, and the Boletín de la Oficina Sanitaria Panamericana and its English-language counterpart, Bulletin of the Pan American Health Organization, launched in 1966.

Since July 2009, the journal is published exclusively in an electronic format, with full text of all published issues available online via SciELO.

== See also ==
Other publications of the World Health Organization:

- Bulletin of the World Health Organization
- Eastern Mediterranean Health Journal
- WHO South-East Asia Journal of Public Health
- Human Resources for Health
- World Health Report
