= Aghurubw =

Carolinian navigator

Aghurubw (pronounced AH-guh-rue-b) was a Carolinian (Refaluwasch) Chief and navigator who led his people from Satawal to what is now Saipan (a commonwealth of the United States in the Western Pacific Ocean) in the early 19th century.

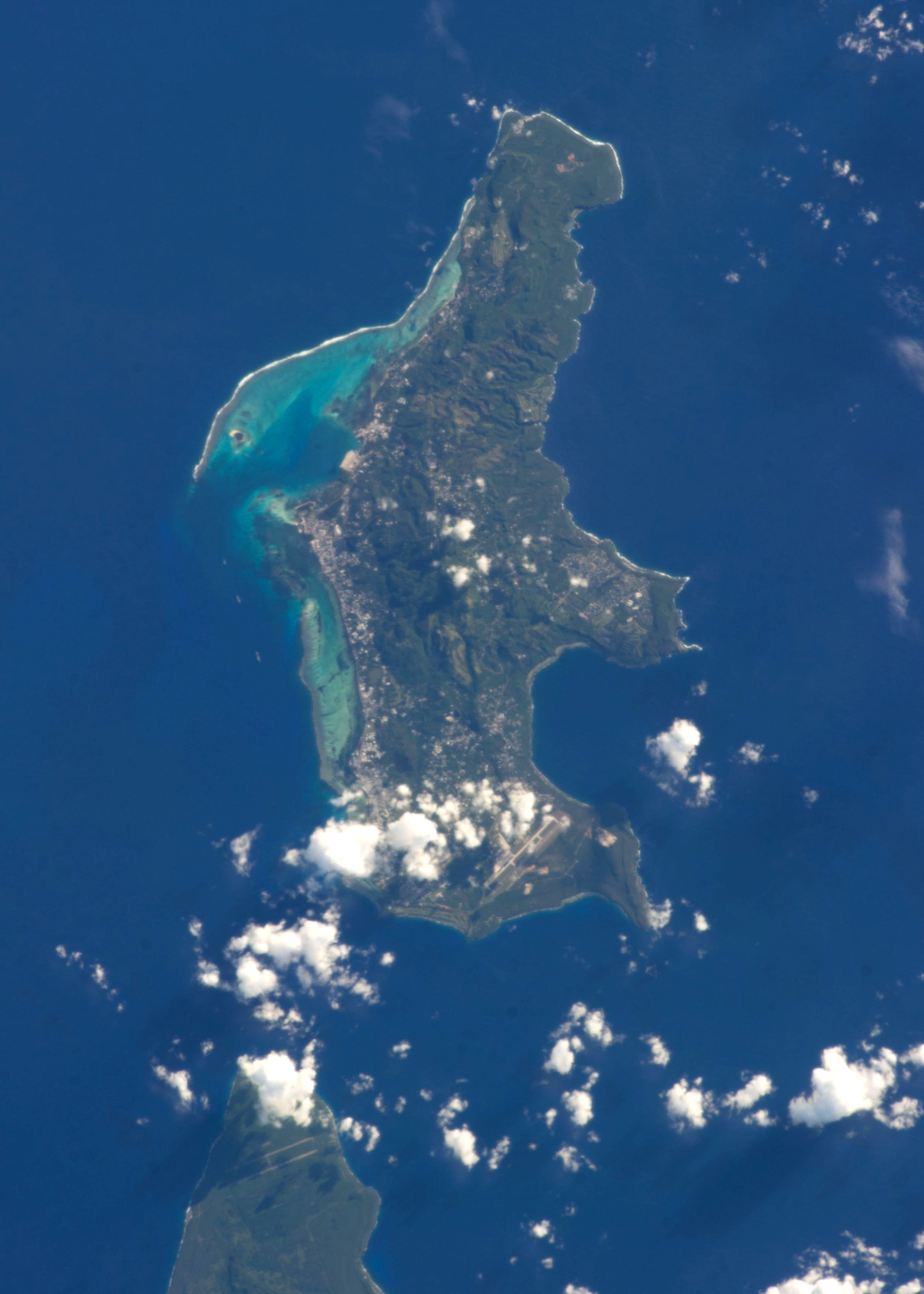
A bird's-eye view image of the island of Saipan

== Navigation to and settlement of Saipan ==
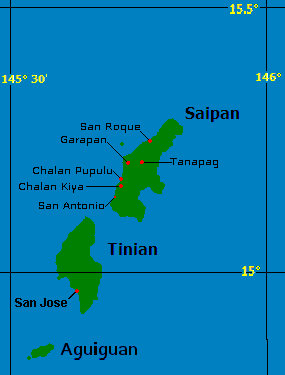
A full map of Tinian

After an 1815 typhoon destroyed life on their home island of Satawal, Chief Aghurubw of the Ghatoliyool clan asked permission from the Spanish Governor, Farallon de Medinilla, for their people to settle on the Island of Saipan.

The Chiefs were granted permission to move to Saipan to manage their cattle herds, turning the island into a ranch or cattle plantation. They were also allowed to go to Tinian, an island neighboring Saipan.

Aghurubw received a legal certificate and the traditional symbols of a leader, a cane and a tall black hat. Due to the tall hat, he was called parúng, the Carolinian word for hat or cap, by the Ghatoliyool.

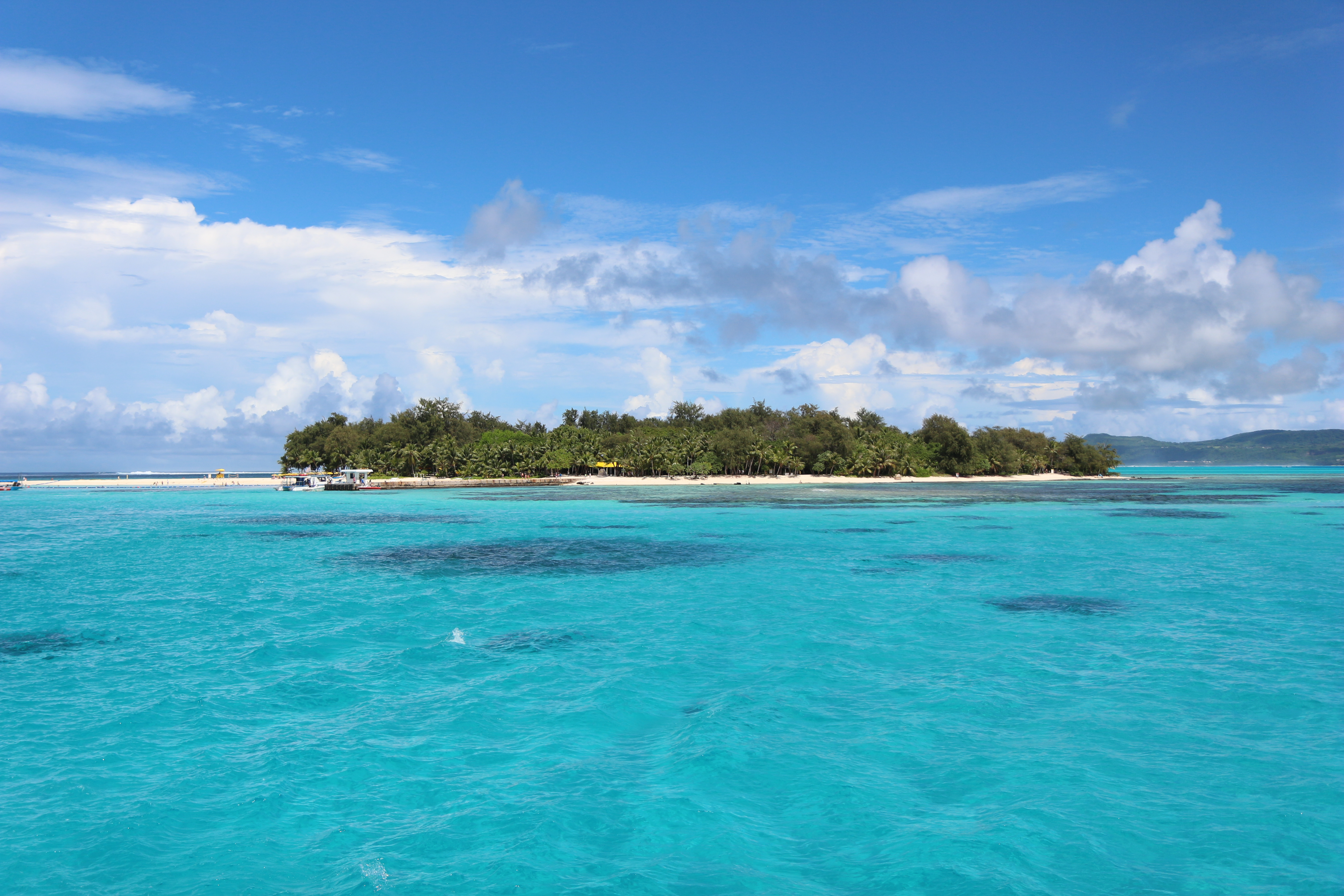
The area where Aghurubw was buried by his family, in accordance with wishes expressed during his life. This area is a mile away from the area of Saipan to which Aghurubw brought the people he led.

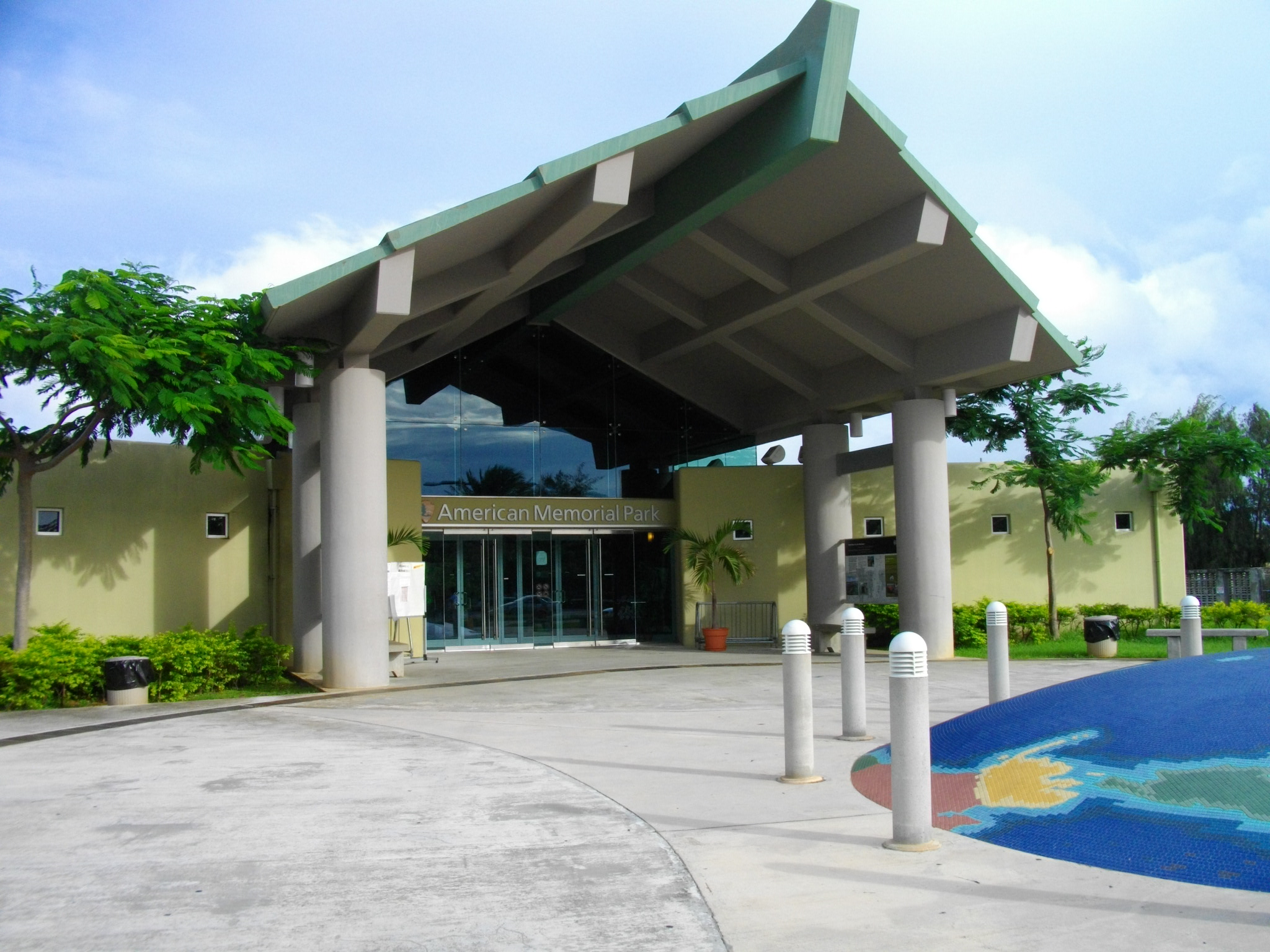
The entrance to American Memorial Park, where Arabwal is located. The park has memorials to WW2 victims as well.

To get to the island of Saipan, Aghurubw used an ancient sea route called metawal wool. He and his party landed on Micro Beach. After bringing the people there, the Carolinians built a village which he called Arabwal.

In 1851, Aghurubw used contacts offering opportunities in the northern isles to advance himself.

Following Chief Aghurubw, more Carolinians came bringing their people and establishing villages on Saipan.

== Legacy ==
After his death in Arabwal, Chief Aghurubw was buried in Mañagaha (Ghalaghal) island, where a statue now stands of him. He was buried upright upon his request, so he could see Micro Beach. The place is sacred to Refaluwasch people in CNMI as a result of his life, influence and burial there. People visit the island every year to celebrate him.

The people of Saipan celebrate 'Chief Aghurubw Day', a holiday which is an important part of the Refaluwasch culture on the CNMI. Additionally, the Ghatoliyool Clan established the Chief Aghurubw Foundation to further his legacy and impact.
