= Elizabeth A. Platz =

American cancer epidemiologist

Academic background
- Education: MPH, 1989, Yale School of Public Health; ScD, 1995, Harvard T.H. Chan School of Public Health
- Thesis: Cancer risk associated with chronic internal exposure to alpha-particles from Thorotrast (1995)

Academic work
- Institutions: Johns Hopkins University
- Doctoral students: Hannah P. Yang

Elizabeth A. Platz is an American cancer epidemiologist. As a professor at Johns Hopkins University, Platz was appointed editor-in-chief of the journal Cancer Epidemiology, Biomarkers & Prevention and elected a Fellow of the American Association for the Advancement of Science.

== Early life and education ==
Platz completed her Master's degree in public health from Yale School of Public Health and her Doctor of Science from the Harvard T.H. Chan School of Public Health.

== Career ==
Following her ScD, Platz joined the faculty at Johns Hopkins University as an assistant professor in the Department of Epidemiology in 1999. While serving in this role, she started the Hormones in Umbilical Cord Blood Study (HUB) to evaluate whether umbilical cord blood hormone and growth factor concentrations differ by race. Platz also co-led a 10-year study of more than 30,000 health professionals that found the longer men take cholesterol-lowering drugs, the far less likely they were to develop advanced prostate cancer. In 2008, Platz was appointed co-director of the Cancer Prevention and Control Program at the Sidney Kimmel Comprehensive Cancer Center.

In 2010, Platz was promoted to the rank of full professor and was selected as the inaugural Abeloff Scholar to support her study into the causes and risk factors of cancer. In 2019, Platz was appointed editor-in-chief of the journal Cancer Epidemiology, Biomarkers & Prevention, one of eight journals published by the American Association for Cancer Research. She was also elected a Fellow of the American Association for the Advancement of Science.
