= Bulletin of the World Health Organization =

- Discipline: Public health
- Language: English, abstracts in Arabic, Chinese, English, French, Russian, Spanish
- Edited by: Laragh Gollogly

Publication details
- History: 1947–present
- Publisher: World Health Organization
- Frequency: Monthly
- Open access: Yes
- Impact factor: 11.1 (2022)

Standard abbreviations
- ISO 4: Bull. World Health Organ.

Indexing
- CODEN: BWHOA6
- ISSN: 0042-9686 (print); 1564-0604 (web)
- LCCN: 52004897
- OCLC no.: 01588496

Links
- Journal homepage; Online access; Online archive; Online archive

The Bulletin of the World Health Organization is a monthly public health journal published by the World Health Organization that was established in 1948. Articles are published in English and abstracts are available in Arabic, Chinese, English, French, Russian, and Spanish. According to the Journal Citation Reports, the journal has a 2022 impact factor of 11.1, ranking it 12th out of 207 journals in the category "Public, Environmental & Occupational Health".

It is an open access journal and uses the Creative Commons 3.0 IGO license (specifically CC BY 3.0 IGO).

== History ==
The first issue of the Bulletin of the World Health Organization was published in 1948 under the initiative of the Interim Commission, and has been published monthly ever since.

== Abstracting and indexing ==
The Bulletin is abstracted and indexed in Abstracts on Hygiene, Biological Abstracts, Current Contents, Excerpta Medica, International Pharmaceutical Abstracts, Index Medicus/MEDLINE/PubMed, Nutrition Abstracts and Reviews, Pollution Abstracts, Science Citation Index, and Tropical Diseases Bulletin.

== See also ==
Other publications of the World Health Organization:

- Eastern Mediterranean Health Journal
- Human Resources for Health (journal published in collaboration with BioMed Central)
- Pan American Journal of Public Health
- World Health Report
- WHO South-East Asia Journal of Public Health
