= Montserrat García-Closas =

Spanish academic and researcher

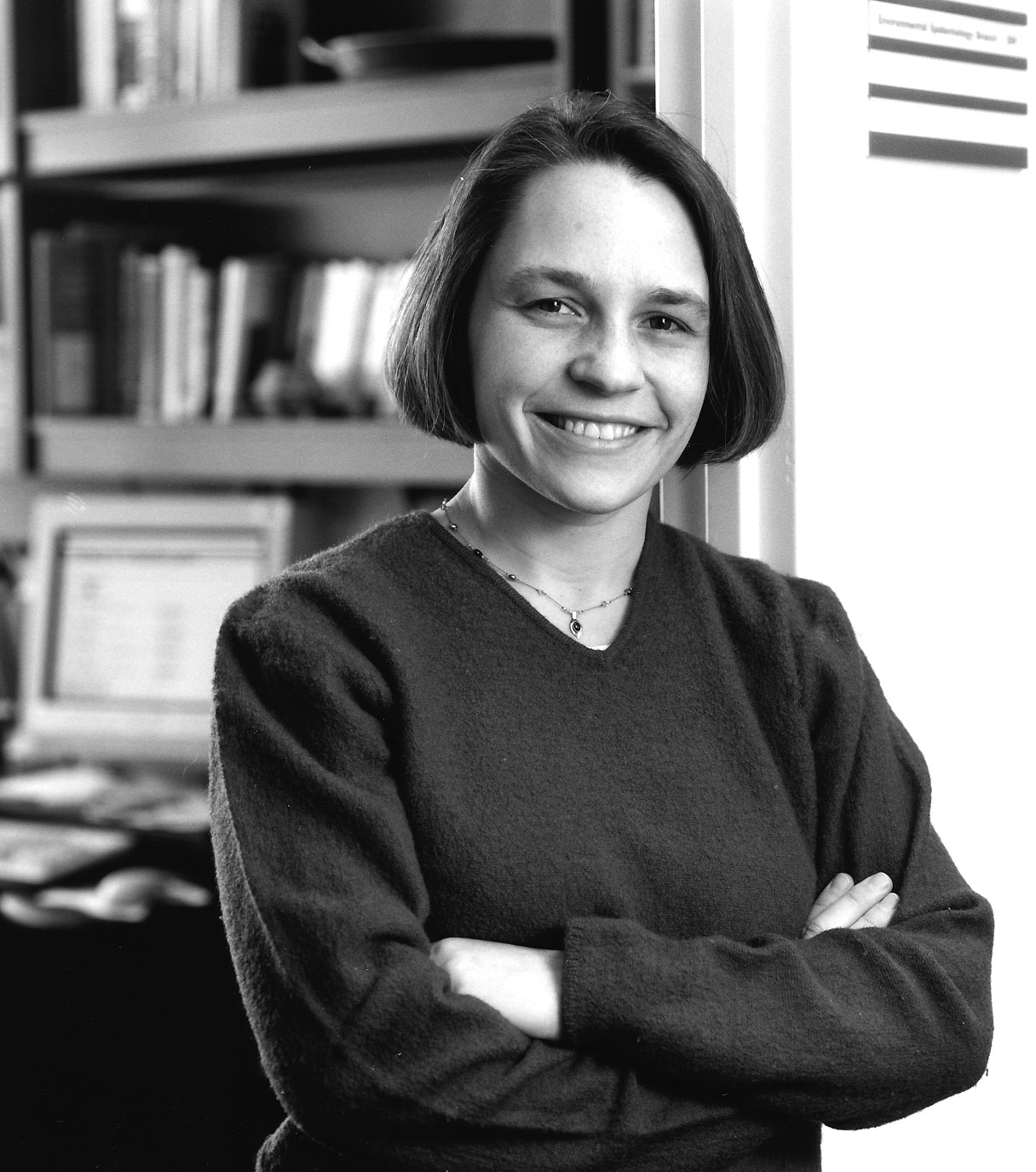
- García-Closas in 2001
- Education: University of Barcelona; Harvard School of Public Health
- Occupations: Researcher and academic
- Scientific career
- Fields: Cancer biomarkers
- Workplaces: Institute of Cancer Research
- Doctoral students: Hannah P. Yang

Montserrat García-Closas, M.D., M.P.H., Dr.P.H., is a Spanish researcher and academic who is best known for her works on identifying cancer biomarkers and genetic susceptibility to cancer. Since 2023, she has been serving as Group Leader for Integrative Cancer Epidemiology at the Institute of Cancer Research (ICR), University of London.

== Education and career ==
García-Closas received her M.D. in 1990 from the University of Barcelona in Spain. She then went on to receive her Masters of Public Health in quantitative methods from the Harvard School of Public Health in 1993, followed by a Doctorate of Public Health in epidemiology also from the Harvard School of Public Health, which she completed in 1996.

After completing her formal education, she became a post-doctoral fellow at the Hormonal and Reproductive Epidemiology Branch of the Division of Cancer Epidemiology & Genetics (DCEG) of the U.S. National Cancer Institute. In 1999 she became a tenure-track investigator and in 2007 she became a tenured senior investigator at the DCEG. She also briefly served as a visiting scientist at University of Cambridge from 2008 until 2010, and in 2010 she became a professor of Epidemiology at the University of London.

She returned to the DCEG in 2015 as its deputy director, and in 2016 was appointed to the position of Acting Chief of the Integrative Tumor Epidemiology Branch.

At the ICR, García-Closas is a Professor of Epidemiology and Group Leader for the Integrative Epidemiology Group. She co-leads the Cancer Epidemiology and Prevention Unit, a joint initiative from the ICR and Imperial College London, and holds an honorary appointment at the Royal Marsden Hospital.

== Research ==
Dr. García-Closas has spent the majority of her career focusing on identifying cancer biomarkers. Her main focuses within this area are on breast and bladder cancers. She was a major contributor to one of the largest studies on breast cancer tumor markers, which was performed under the Breast Cancer Association Consortium (BCAC). This study involved collecting breast tissue samples from thousands of individuals and identifying the differences between them that lead to differing clinical outcomes. In a separate project under the BCAC, she is also one of the head researchers on a project which aims to uncover how genetic and environmental factors impact cancer progression. In her research on bladder cancer, she is also working to determine genetic biomarkers that predispose individuals to develop bladder cancers. To identify biomarkers, Dr. García-Closas uses a genome-wide association study (GWAS), which is an approach to research which involves acquiring many genomes and comparing them to identify differing genetic markers that might be potential biomarkers.

== Significant Publications ==
- Easton, Douglas F et al. “Genome-wide association study identifies novel breast cancer susceptibility loci.” Nature vol. 447,7148 (2007): 1087-93.
- Sholom Wacholder, Stephen Chanock, Montserrat Garcia-Closas, Laure El Ghormli, Nathaniel Rothman, Assessing the Probability That a Positive Report is False: An Approach for Molecular Epidemiology Studies, JNCI: Journal of the National Cancer Institute, Volume 96, Issue 6, 17 March 2004, Pages 434–442.
- Blows, F., Driver, K., Schmidt, M., Broeks, A., Leeuwen, F., Wesseling, J., . . . Huntsman, D. (n.d.). Subtyping of Breast Cancer by Immunohistochemistry to Investigate a Relationship between Subtype and Short and Long Term Survival: A Collaborative Analysis of Data for 10,159 Cases from 12 Studies.
- Michailidou, K., Hall, P., Gonzalez-Neira, A., Ghoussaini, M., Dennis, J., Milne, R., . . . Easton, D. (2013, April). Large-scale genotyping identifies 41 new loci associated with breast cancer risk.

== Honors and awards ==
- 2001 - National Institute of Health Merit Award
- 2004 - National Cancer Institute Intramural Research Award
- 2007 - DCEG Women Scientist Advisory Award
