= World Health Report =

- Discipline: Global health
- Language: English and multiple

Publication details
- History: 1995–2013
- Publisher: World Health Organization (Switzerland)
- Frequency: Irregular

Standard abbreviations
- ISO 4: World Health Rep.

Links
- Global Health Observatory homepage; Previous reports

The World Health Report (WHR) is a series of annual reports produced by the World Health Organization (WHO). First published in 1995, the World Health Report is WHO's leading publication. The reports were published every year from 1995 to 2008, and again in 2010 and 2013. The reports are available in multiple languages, and include an expert assessment of a specific global health topic, relating to all countries that are Member States of the organization.

The main purpose of the WHR is to provide policymakers, donor agencies, international organizations and others with the information they need to help them make appropriate health policy and funding decisions. However, the report is also accessible to a wider audience, such as universities, journalists and the public at large. It is expected that anyone, with a professional or personal interest in international health issues, will be able to read and take use of it..

== List of themes by year ==
Each WHR addresses a different theme. The following is a list of reports and themes.

- 2013: Research for universal health coverage
- 2010: Health systems financing: The path to universal coverage
- 2008: Primary health care: Now more than ever
- 2007: A safer future: global public health security in the 21st century
- 2006: Working together for health
- 2005: Make every mother and child count
- 2004: Changing history
- 2003: Shaping the future
- 2002: Reducing risks, promoting healthy life
- 2001: Mental health: new understanding, new hope
- 2000: Health systems: improving performance
- 1999: Making a difference
- 1998: Life in the 21st century: a vision for all
- 1997: Conquering suffering, enriching humanity
- 1996: Fighting disease, fostering development
- 1995: Bridging the gaps

== WHR 2013: Research for universal health coverage ==
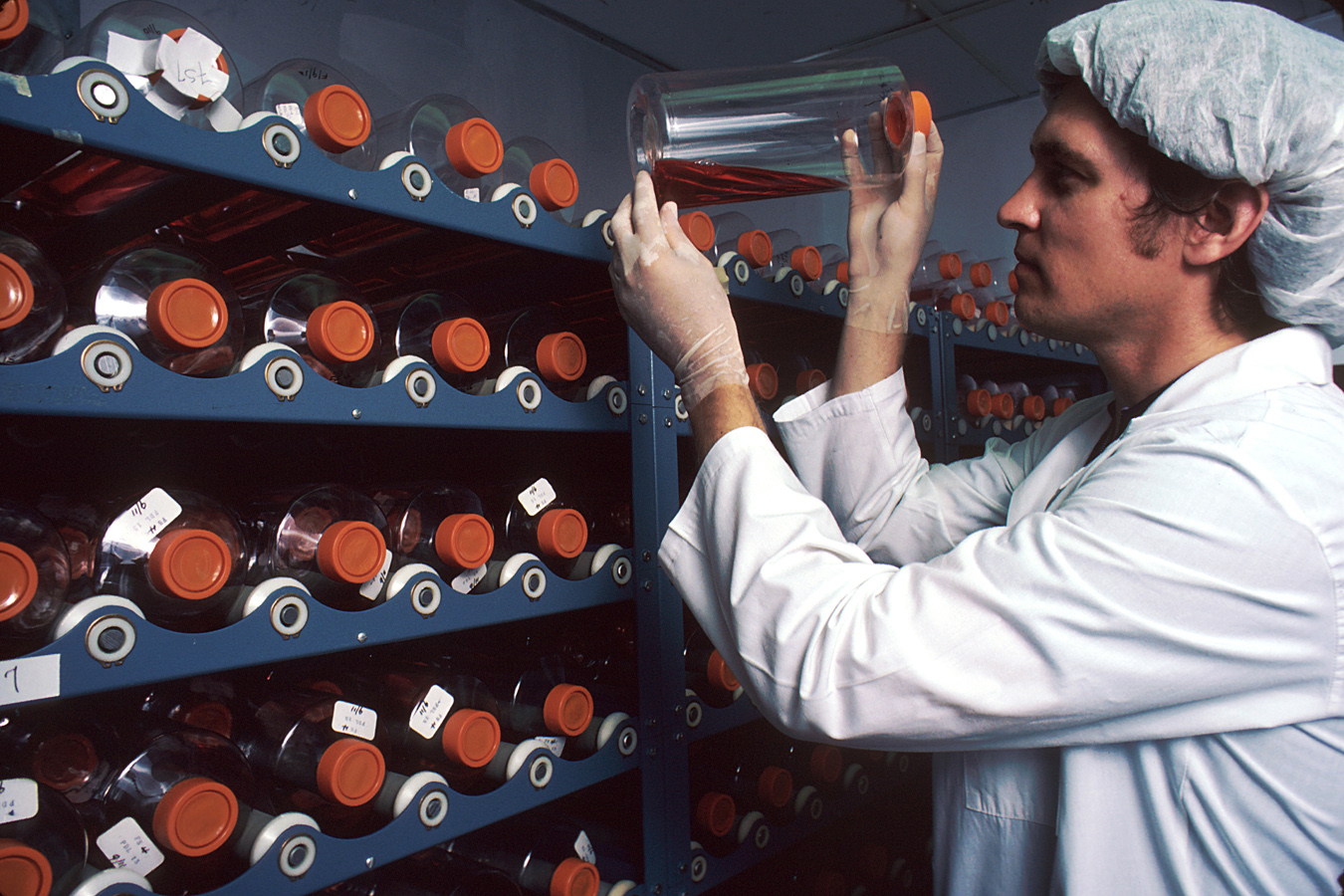
Cell culture vials

The World Health Report 2013 focuses on the importance of research in advancing progress towards universal health care coverage – in other words, full access to high-quality services for prevention, treatment and financial risk protection. The report advocates for increased international and national investment in research aimed specifically at improving coverage of health services within and between countries. Examples of required research include medical research, or investigating the causes of ill-health and the interventions needed to improve health and wellbeing, as well as health services research, focusing on how to expand service coverage and reduce inequities in coverage.

== Previous reports ==
=== 2010: Health Systems Financing ===
The World Health Report 2010 focused on the topic of universal health care coverage, and how countries can modify their financing systems to move towards this goal. The report provided an action agenda for countries at all stages of development, and proposed ways that the international community can better support efforts in low-income countries to achieve universal coverage and improve population health outcomes.

=== 2008: Primary health care ===
The theme of the World Health Report 2008 was the renewal of primary health care, and the need for health systems to respond better and faster to the health care challenges of a changing world.

=== 2007: Global public health security ===
The main concern of the World Health Report 2007 was how the world is at increasing risk of disease outbreaks, epidemics, industrial accidents, natural disasters and other health emergencies which can rapidly become threats to global public health security. The report described how the new International Health Regulations help countries to work together to identify risks and act to contain and control them.

=== 2006: Working together for health ===
Nations identified in WHR2006 with critical shortage of health workers

The World Health Report 2006 (WHR2006) highlighted the estimated shortage of almost 4.3 million doctors, nurses, midwives, and other health human resources worldwide, calling the situation a "global health workforce crisis". The report laid out a ten-year action plan for building national health workforces through better training, recruitment and management processes.

=== 2005: Make every mother and child count ===
The World Health Report 2005 focused on the fact that almost 11 million children under five years of age die annually from causes that are largely preventable, and another half a million women die in pregnancy, childbirth or soon after. The report said that reducing this toll in line with the Millennium Development Goals would depend largely on every mother and every child having the right to access to health care from pregnancy through childbirth, the neonatal period and childhood.

=== 2004: Changing history ===
The topic of the World Health Report 2004 was the global HIV/AIDS pandemic.

=== 2003: Shaping the future ===
The World health report 2003 examined the global health situation and some of the major threats to health. The report advocated that major improvements in health for all were within reach, and that progress depended on collaboration among governments, international institutions, the private sector and civil society to build stronger health systems.

=== 2002: Reducing risks, promoting healthy life ===
The World health report 2002 described the amount of disease, disability and death in the world that could be attributed to a selected number of the most important risks to human health. It projected how much this burden could lowered in the next 20 years if the same risk factors were reduced.

=== 2001: Mental health ===
The largely neglected area of mental health was the core focus of the World health report 2001.

=== 2000: Health systems: improving performance ===
The World Health Report 2000 introduced a conceptual framework and measurement approach to examine and compare aspects of health systems around the world, and better understand the complex factors that explain how health systems perform. The report provided an assessment of the performance of national health systems for all countries.

== See also ==
- World Health Day
- World report on disability
- Bulletin of the World Health Organization
- Eastern Mediterranean Health Journal
- Human Resources for Health journal
- U-Report
- Pan American Journal of Public Health
- WHO South-East Asia Journal of Public Health
