= Public health journal =

Scientific journal devoted to public health

A public health journal is a scientific journal devoted to the field of public health, including epidemiology, biostatistics, and health care (including medicine, nursing and related fields). Public health journals, like most scientific journals, are peer-reviewed. Public health journals are commonly published by health organizations and societies, such as the Bulletin of the World Health Organization or the Journal of Epidemiology and Community Health (published by the British Medical Association). Many others are published by a handful of large publishing corporations that includes Elsevier, Wolters Kluwer, Wiley-Blackwell, Springer Science+Business Media, and Informa, each of which has many imprints (which are brands named after former independent publishers that were merged or acquired). Many societies partner with such corporations to handle the work of producing their journals.

The increase in public health research in recent decades has seen a rapid increase in the number of articles and journals. As such, many public health journals have emerged with a specialized focus, such as in the area of policy (e.g. Journal of Public Health Policy), a specific region or country of the world (e.g. Asia-Pacific Journal of Public Health, Pan American Journal of Public Health or Eastern Mediterranean Health Journal), a specific intervention/practice area (e.g. Cancer Epidemiology, Biomarkers & Prevention), or other particular focus (e.g. Human Resources for Health).

== Scope ==
Public health journals often indicate their target audience as being interdisciplinary, including health care professionals, public health decision-makers and researchers. A main objective is to support evidence-based policy and evidence-based practice in public health. In contrast, medical journals (e.g. The Lancet) typically focus on reaching medical professionals as their main audience, although the boundaries between these two categories are increasingly blurry.

It has been argued that some medical and public health journals are "filled with increasingly complex science" which depends upon advanced statistics and research methods that health care providers may have difficulty understanding. In response they have turned towards publishing "articles that are more journalism than science" such as reviews, news, and educational material. However, science is what attracts major attention and leads institutions and libraries to purchase subscriptions. Academic or scientific journals typically include editorial boards that oversee peer review, set editorial policies, and make decisions about what research is published. However, critics have noted that power asymmetries within global health research are reflected in journal governance; a 2025 systematic review found that editorial boards of global health journals are predominantly based in high-income countries, raising concerns about whose knowledge is prioritized.

== Review process ==
For an article to be accepted for publication in a public health or medical journal it must typically undergo a review process. Each journal creates its own process, but they have certain common characteristics in general. There are various general "levels" of scrutiny, which have some effect on the respect given to articles published in the journals. Some broad categories might be editorial review, peer review, and blind peer review. Richard Smith, former editor of the British Medical Journal, stated in 2006 that studies had found peer review to be ineffective and prone to abuse, but noted that editors consider it invaluable.

=== Editorial review ===
In this process, articles which meet the minimum requirements for submission (such as including the necessary descriptions of funding, privacy and publication releases, ethics/institutional review board approval, statements of original work, signatures of authors, and so on,) are first looked over by a managing editor or a member of an editorial board. They may be referred back to the authors for revision and resubmission, rejected, or presented to the editorial board for final approval.

=== Peer review ===
A more stringent review process includes a full peer review. After first review by a managing editor or member of an editorial board, an article which has good possibilities will be sent out for review by two or more researchers in the specific area. If these reviews are positive the article may be referred back to the authors to address any comments by the reviewers, or (rarely) may be accepted immediately by the editorial board.

==== Blind peer review ====
One common review process is the same as the peer review above, except all references to the authors are removed from the article before review by the researchers.

== Content ==
Most public health journals include various types of content, such as:

- Editorial
- Letter to the Editor
- Original research
- Literature review, systematic review and meta-analysis
- Abstracts from scientific meetings or other journals
- Technical notes

Medical journals may also include, for example, case reports and clinical images of interest. Some online journals are also moving to publishing video content (e.g. Journal of Visualized Experiments).

== Internet and open access ==
By the early 21st century, most public health and medical journals were available online, thus increasing their accessibility worldwide. There is a general move from print as primary medium to electronic publication, an example being the online journals published by BioMed Central.

With the advent of online publication, some health journals are transforming from traditional subscription-based and pay-per-view access to open access for some or all of their content.

== Impact factor ==
Like other scientific journals, many public health journals are ranked with an impact factor, linked to the probability of an article published in that journal being cited. It is currently accepted that a higher impact factor indicates a better journal quality, at least in some health disciplines.

Journals with high impact factors according to the Journal Citation Reports in the category "Public, Environmental and Occupational Health" include: Environmental Health Perspectives, American Journal of Epidemiology, Annual Review of Public Health, Genetic Epidemiology, Epidemiologic Reviews, Cancer Epidemiology, Biomarkers & Prevention, International Journal of Epidemiology, Epidemiology, Bulletin of the World Health Organization and American Journal of Public Health.

In addition, given their interdisciplinary nature, some journals with a public health focus may be found in other categories. For example, Human Resources for Health is placed in the category "industrial relations and labor", where it was ranked 1st in 2012.

== See also ==
- Biomedical research
- Health services research
- List of medical journals
- List of nursing journals
- Medical literature
- National public health institutes
