= Hannah P. Yang =

American cancer epidemiologist

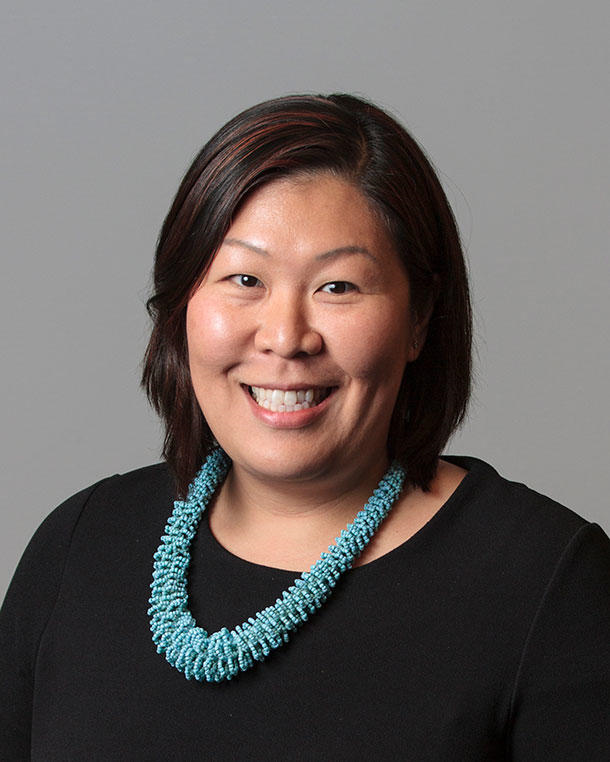
- Education: University of Pennsylvania; Johns Hopkins Bloomberg School of Public Health
- Scientific career
- Fields: Cancer epidemiology
- Workplaces: National Cancer Institute
- Doctoral advisor: Elizabeth A. Platz; Montserrat García-Closas

Hannah P. Yang is an American cancer epidemiologist who is a staff scientist and associate director of scientific operations in the National Cancer Institute's division of cancer epidemiology and genetics.

== Life ==
Yang was born to Joe Hyun-Seung and Saesoon Yang. Her grandmother was Shin Nam Rye. Yang received a B.S. in biology and the history and sociology of science from the University of Pennsylvania. She completed a Sc.M. and Ph.D. in epidemiology from the Johns Hopkins Bloomberg School of Public Health. Her 2009 dissertation was titled The association of smoking and common variants in estrogen metabolizing genes with endometrial cancer risk. Elizabeth A. Platz and Montserrat García-Closas served as her doctoral advisors.

Yang joined the National Cancer Institute's (NCI) division of cancer epidemiology and genetics (DCEG) as a predoctoral fellow in 2007 and completed her doctoral work through the Hopkins-DCEG partnership training program in cancer epidemiology. Upon completion of her doctorate, she became a postdoctoral fellow from 2009 to 2011 and then a research fellow from 2011 to 2012. Yang was appointed as a staff scientist in 2012. She is the DCEG associate director of scientific operations. In the DCEG office of the director, Yang oversees scientific review, site visits, annual and ad hoc reporting, executive search committees, budget formulation, and division liaison activities to NCI and NIH entities. She supports the planning of a new prospective multi-center cohort study.
