= Preventing Chronic Disease =

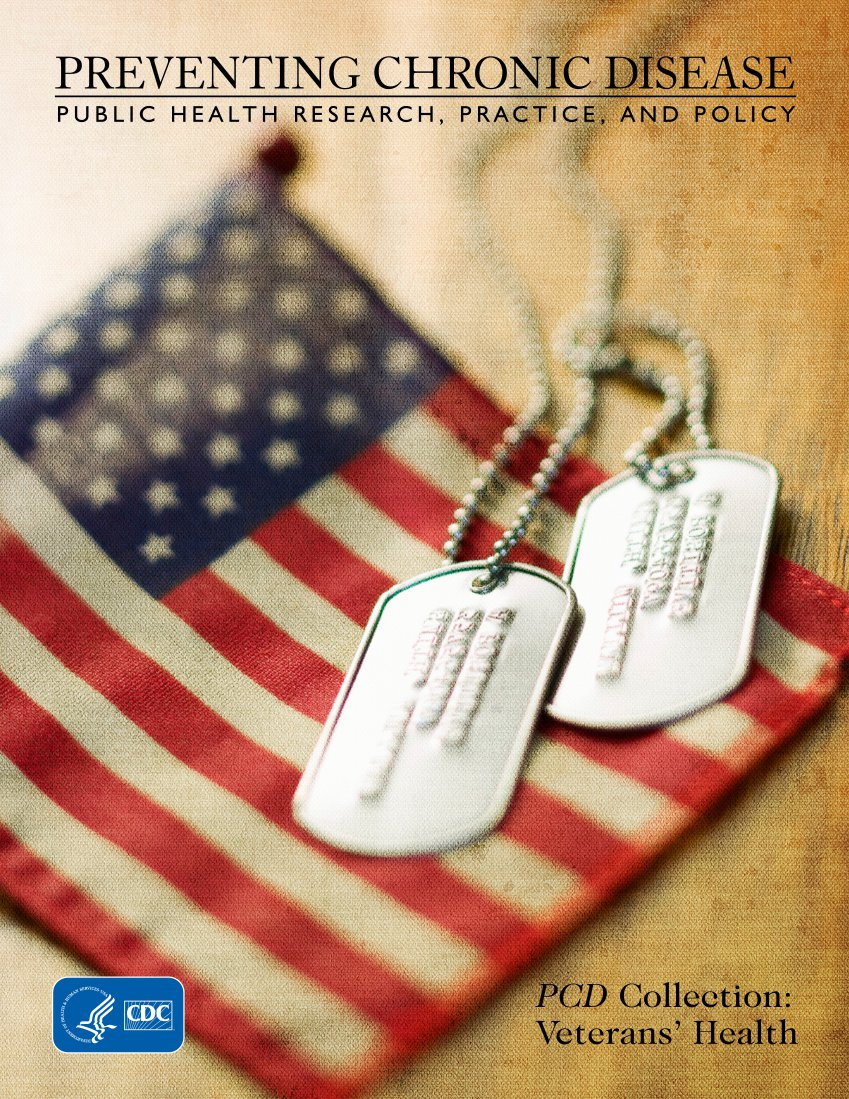
- Discipline: Public health
- Language: English
- Edited by: Leonard Jack, Jr, PhD, MSc

Publication details
- History: 2004-present
- Publisher: Centers for Disease Control and Prevention (United States)
- Frequency: Weekly
- Open access: Yes
- License: Public domain
- Impact factor: 2.038 (2018)

Standard abbreviations
- ISO 4: Prev. Chronic Dis.

Indexing
- ISSN: 1545-1151
- LCCN: 2003215237
- OCLC no.: 52392186

Links
- Journal homepage; Online access; Online archive

Preventing Chronic Disease is a peer-reviewed open access medical journal established by the National Center for Chronic Disease Prevention and Health Promotion (Centers for Disease Control and Prevention), covering research on all aspects of chronic diseases.

The PCD Collections are articles grouped together that feature a common theme. One example involved publication of articles on Aboriginal populations with the Public Health Agency of Canada journal Chronic Diseases in Canada in 2010. Other collections have focused on veteran's health, community health, and healthy aging.

According to the Journal Citation Reports, the journal had a 2014 impact factor of 2.123.
