= HRHIS =

Health data process

A human resource for health information system (HRHIS), also known as human resource information system (HRIS) — is a system for collecting, processing, managing and disseminating data and information on human resource for health (HRH). Depending on the level of development of a country's health care system and the organization of its workforce, an HRHIS can be computerized or paper-based, including information on numbers and distribution of health workers and track their career information. It is usually an integral part of a comprehensive health management information system, and may be used to monitor and assess the performance of the overall health system.

For example, in Tanzania the title Human Resource for Health Information System refers to an open-source software for HRH information management developed by the Department of Computer Science, University of Dar es Salaam for the Ministry of Health and Social Welfare (Tanzania), and funded by the Japan International Cooperation Agency (JICA) and other development partners. The system supports the capture of data linked to any level in the organizational hierarchy and is customizable at both the input and output sides.

In Canada, the HRHIS is composed of multiple computerized components, including the National Physician Database and the Registered Nurses Database. There is increasing demand to incorporate social indicators within the underlying information systems, including data on whether the health workforce reflects the demographics of the population it serves in terms of gender, language, ethnicity and other social attributes, although implementation generally lags.

For another example, in Uganda, an open-source HRHIS was implemented under the request of the Ugandan Ministry of Health (MOH), to link and better manage a variety of independent sources of health workforce data, including data from censuses and other national surveys, MOH administrative records, district level sources, independent research studies, and health professional council data.

In Brazil, the national web-based HRHIS (known in Portuguese as sistema de informação e gestão de recursos humanos em saúde) was implemented by the Brazilian Ministry of Health under a process of health systems reform and decentralization, catalyzed by the availability of new information technologies at the level of local health organizations. Botswana developed its HRHIS in 1994, and Ministry of Health staff used the data as a basis for coordinated national workforce planning efforts with other agencies and ministries, such as the Department of Local Government which employs health workers in local regions.

== HRHIS in Tanzania ==
The Tanzania Ministry of Health and Social Welfare (MOHSW) identified health workforce information as a key area needing to be strengthened for fast tracking implementation of its Human Resource Strategic Plan. The HRHIS was implemented as an effort to improve human resources for health (HRH) management. A situation analysis indicated the existence of several databases within and outside the ministry dealing with HRH, often with similar information fields. It was agreed these sources should be harmonized, and housed under Health Management Information System (HMIS) for consistency. The HRHIS software thus became part of the HMIS and was fully integrated with the District Health Information System (DHIS) software through import/export mechanisms.

Tanzania HRHIS
- Developer(s): Computer Science Department
- Written in: PHP
- Operating system: Linux
- Type: Human resource for health information system
- Website: www.hisptanzania.or.tz/hris.php

The HRHIS was built using free and open source technologies PHP (server scripting language), PostgreSQL (database management system) running on multi-platform (Windows, Linux) architecture, and designed to be user-friendly allowing administrators or authorized users to add additional elements as new needs arise. The initial database was populated with the minimum dataset as requested by the MOHSW.

The HRHIS provided import/output mechanisms for data at different levels, such as national, regional, district or facility level. It was designed to provide flexibility to:

- Capture and store health personnel's data and history by organizational unit, cadre, and other characteristics;
- Add any number of datasets or elements required by any sector (such as the central health ministry, local governments, civil services or private providers);
- Update organizational unit details according to users' requirements (e.g. allowing additional regions, districts and health facilities to be added dynamically without entering into system codes);
- Generate web-enabled reports in different formats (general and aggregated), including graphical reporting.

Since human resource information/data are personal and confidential, the HRHIS system was developed with high security measures for protecting the data entered. Security measures include a login mechanism such that only authorized personnel can use the system, and also a Users Administration functionality which allows the system administrator to limit users' access to certain functions.

The system was built by UDSM developers and analysts considered conversant with the changing needs of the health sector and Tanzania's context. It is used in MOHSW headquarters, across the Coast region (regional level and all districts), and implementation has covered all Regions and Districts in Tanzania Mainland

== HRHIS in Canada ==
Canada National Physician Database (NPDB)
- Developer(s): Canadian Institute for Health Information
- Initial release: 2006
- Type: Human resource for health information system
- Website: www.hisptanzania.or.tz/hris.php

The Canadian Institute for Health Information maintains several HRH databases as part of a comprehensive national HRHIS. They include:

- Registered Physicians Database
- Registered Nurses Database
- Pharmacist Database
- Occupational Therapist Database
- Medical Radiation Technologist Database
- Medical Laboratory Technologist Database
- Physiotherapist Database
- Scott’s Medical Database.

The databases capture and store information on workforce size, practice settings and regulatory environments, as well as trends in supply, demographics and education. They record information captured through transmission according to specifications from all provinces and territories, professional regulatory and licensing bodies, and/or educational institutions. Each database includes unique identifiers for tracking health professionals through time and as they move from one location to another; is accompanied by documentation on data quality; and is governed by security arrangements with respect to the protection of personal information of health professionals. The data are used by governments, researchers and professional associations for HRH planning.

== See also ==
- Human resources for health general issues
- Health information management
- Health informatics
- Public health informatics
- Human Resources for Health journal
