= Asia-Pacific Journal of Public Health =

- Discipline: Public health
- Language: English
- Edited by: Wah Yun Low

Publication details
- History: 1987–present
- Publisher: SAGE Publications
- Frequency: Quarterly
- Impact factor: 1.459 (2014)

Standard abbreviations
- ISO 4: Asia-Pac. J. Public Health

Indexing
- ISSN: 1010-5395 (print); 1941-2479 (web)
- LCCN: 93641426
- OCLC no.: 16410445

Links
- Journal homepage; Online access; Online archive

The Asia-Pacific Journal of Public Health is a quarterly peer-reviewed public health journal published by SAGE Publications. It was established in 1987 and is the official journal of the Asia-Pacific Academic Consortium for Public Health. It covers public health related issues, especially as relating to the Asia-Pacific region. The editor-in-chief is Wah Yun Low (University of Malaya).

== Abstracting and indexing ==
The journal is abstracted and indexed in CINAHL, EMBASE/Excerpta Medica, MEDLINE, PsycINFO, SafetyLit, Science Citation Index Expanded, Scopus, and the Social Sciences Citation Index. According to the Journal Citation Reports, the journal has a 2014 impact factor of 1.459.
