= Cancer Epidemiology, Biomarkers & Prevention =

- Discipline: Cancer epidemiology
- Language: English
- Edited by: Elizabeth A. Platz

Publication details
- History: 1991-present
- Publisher: American Association for Cancer Research (United States)
- Frequency: monthly
- Impact factor: 4.344 (2019)

Standard abbreviations
- ISO 4: Cancer Epidemiol. Biomark. Prev.
- NLM: Cancer Epidemiol Biomarkers Prev

Indexing
- CODEN: CEBPE4
- ISSN: 1055-9965 (print); 1538-7755 (web)
- OCLC no.: 23441645

Links
- Journal homepage

Cancer Epidemiology, Biomarkers & Prevention is a peer-reviewed medical journal devoted to research in the field of cancer epidemiology. Topics include descriptive, analytical, biochemical, and molecular epidemiology, the use of biomarkers to study the neoplastic and preneoplastic processes in humans, chemoprevention and other types of prevention trials, and the role of behavioral factors in cancer etiology and prevention. It is published by the American Association for Cancer Research and co-sponsored by the American Society of Preventive Oncology.

Indexed by ISI Cancer Epidemiology, Biomarkers & Prevention collected an impact factor of 5.057 as reported in the 2018 Journal Citation Reports by Thomson Reuters, ranking it 48 out of 230 journals in the category Oncology and ranking it 13 out of 186 journals in the category Public, environmental & occupational health.
