= Healthcare in Belize =

Belize Medical Associates, a healthcare facility in Belize City

Healthcare in Belize is provided through both public and private healthcare systems. The Ministry of Health (MoH) is the government agency responsible for overseeing the entire health sector and is also the largest provider of public health services in Belize. The MoH offers affordable care to a majority of Belizeans with a strong focus on providing quality healthcare through a range of public programs and institutions.

In contrast to the public health sector, the private health sector provides care to a smaller portion of the population. However, similar to the public sector, private health services are offered at a relatively low cost with a shared emphasis on quality of care and quality improvement.

The Human Rights Measurement Initiative finds that Belize is fulfilling 83.0% of what it should be fulfilling for the right to health based on its level of income. When looking at the right to health with respect to children, Belize achieves 99.1% of what is expected based on its current income. In regards to the right to health amongst the adult population, the country achieves only 86.6% of what is expected based on the nation's level of income. Belize falls into the "very bad" category when evaluating the right to reproductive health because the nation is fulfilling only 63.2% of what the nation is expected to achieve based on the resources (income) it has available.

== Current history ==
The need for improved primary healthcare strategies was recognized during the 1980s. A formalized assessment of the health sector was not approved by the Government of Belize (GoB) and the Inter-American Development Bank (IDB) until 1994. Two years later, the MoH launched a National Health Plan, "Quest for Equity", which included an analysis of the major health conditions and determinants of health impacting Belize.

The results revealed a number of problems surrounding the health sector and identified key policy areas and priorities for improving the healthcare system. The issues identified in the diagnostic report laid the foundation for government initiated Health Sector Reform Project (HSRP), which was implemented in 2000. The primary objectives of the reform project included increasing access to care, improving quality of care, and ensuring the efficient and equitable delivery of care across both health sectors.

One of the major accomplishments of the reform project included the establishment of four health regions (northern, central, western, and southern health region) designated to provide health services to distinct geographical areas across Belize. All four health regions offer primary care and secondary care services. Only the Central Health Region, which serves the largest population in Belize, offers tertiary care services [see Health care delivery for description of levels of care]. In addition some progress was made in terms of the organization and management of the health system.

The Ministry of Health (MoH) is responsible for overseeing the entire health sector and is also the largest provider of public health services.

Since the inception of the HSRP, there have been continued efforts focused on reformation of the health sector with the national goal of improving health status through accessible quality care. In line with these goals, the health agenda for the 2007–2011 National Health Plan included a list of essential public health functions that specified minimum performance levels that both the public and private health sector must adhere to in order to maintain and improve health outcomes.

During this time, there was also further expansion of primary care services and an increasing emphasis on mental health. For example, the MoH launched a strategic mental health plan in 2009 aimed at integrating mental health services into primary care. Specifically, the mental health plan aims to achieve greater mental health through increased delivery of community-based care and targeted efforts to improve prevention and management of mental disorders as well as improved psychosocial rehabilitation.

=== Current health initiatives ===
Current health initiatives include the widespread implementation of a National Health Insurance (NHI) program and further development and implementation of the Belize Health Information System (BHIS).

National Health Insurance: The goal of developing a national health insurance program grew out of earlier health care reform efforts to provide affordable and accessible quality care. A pilot project was established in the south side of Belize City in 2001 and was expanded to the southern region of Belize in 2006.

A separate agency within the Social Security Board has been established to oversee the financing and purchasing duties for the NHI fund, while the MoH remains in charge of the regulatory and policy-making functions. An important component of the NHI program is the implementation of a pay for performance system (P4P), that provides financial incentives for meeting specified quality performance standards. Today, there are continued efforts to expand the NHI program throughout Belize.

Belize Health Information System: A need for a stronger health information system (HIS) was identified during early health reform efforts (1998) and was realized in 2008 with the introduction of the Belize Health Information System. The BHIS is an integrated comprehensive health information system that allows for the collection and dissemination of population-based and record-based health data with the goal of improving health outcomes and health performance.

The BHIS was originally deployed in urban areas in 2008 and was expanded to various hospitals and clinics across the four health regions by 2009. Following a comprehensive assessment of the BHIS, the MoH introduced a National HIS strategic plan (2009) to be carried out across a four-year period (2010–2014). Primary objectives of the plan include: expanding BHIS coverage to rural areas, strengthening the registration system, and improving data security and health information privacy.

== Public healthcare ==
While public healthcare in Belize is available to all of the population at no direct cost to the individual, a large portion of funding has been allocated to Belize City. Karl Heusner Memorial Hospital (KHMH), the national and regional referral hospital for Belize, is located in Belize City. Karl Heusner Memorial Hospital is considered to be the premier public healthcare provider in Belize. However, due to funding issues, the hospital has faced many challenges with equipment problems, medical supply shortages, and operation management problems.

=== Other districts ===
Outside of Belize City, there are seven additional hospitals (located within the capitals of each of the seven other districts) that provide public healthcare. Among the seven district capital hospitals there are three regional hospitals: the Southern Regional Hospital in Dangriga, the Northern Regional Hospital in Orange Walk Town, and the Western Regional Hospital in the nation’s capital of Belmopan. Together, these regional hospitals provide more services to the public than the capital hospitals of Corozal and Toledo district.

=== Rural healthcare ===
Belize has a network of approximately 60 public health clinics, with a total of 700 public hospital beds, that provide primary medical and dental care to rural areas. Most of these health clinics suffer from inadequate staffing, lack of financial resources to handle the patient volume, and a lack of equipment and medicine. As a result, there is reduced access to (quality) care. An additional challenge surrounds the tendency for individuals residing in rural areas to utilize non-western medicine for their health needs rather than seeking publicly available health services. This creates problems in fully assessing the standard of healthcare in Belize and thus delays medical statistics requested by the United Nations and other interested parties.

=== Mental health ===
In the 1990s, Belize introduced a program in which psychiatric nurse practitioners were trained and integrated into community-based care. Today, mental health services are available in district hospitals throughout the country. Most inpatient psychiatric services are provided at Rockview Hospital, the national mental hospital based in the Central Region. Mental Health services are also provided in the acute psychiatric ward in Belmopan Hospital, located in the Western Region.

Psychotropic medications are available in all district hospitals as well as in the polyclinic located in Belize City. Availability of psychotropic drugs is intermittent and patients sometimes need to purchase their own medications. In terms of medical staff, there are two psychiatric nurses allocated to provide mental health services in seven of the eight district hospitals. The introduction of psychiatric nurse practitioners has facilitated numerous improvements including: a reduction in the number of admissions to the psychiatric hospital, an increase in outpatient services, and the development of community-based mental health prevention and promotion programs.

== Private healthcare ==
The government of Belize, with assistance from the European Union and United Nations, has undertaken a major restructuring of the healthcare system. In 1990, the private sector became an increasingly important player in service delivery, providing services to approximately 15% of the population. Private healthcare for many people in Belize continues to play an increasingly important role.

Today, the private sector provides some additional tertiary care and imaging services not available in the public system. Persons in need of these services can purchase out of pocket from the private sector or the MoH can purchase these services on their behalf. Private institutions also accept medical insurance plans. In addition, P4P contracts have been implemented in Belize, via the NHI program, in order to improve quality care.

=== Private hospitals and clinics ===
The country has three main private hospitals. La Loma Luz Hospital is a private institution run by the Seventh Day Adventist mission. Belize Medical Associates is a 25 bed private hospital that offers radiology and neurological services. Universal Health Services is also another private healthcare facility in Belize City. In total Belize has 100 private hospital beds. Belize’s private healthcare sector is divided into nonprofit and for-profit facilities. Belize Medical Associates and Universal Health Services are both for-profit hospitals. La Loma Luz Hospital is a non-profit hospital.

In addition, there are over 50 for-profit clinics and four nonprofit clinics spread throughout Belize. Half of these private clinics are located in Belize City. The overlap between private and public is common. Government institutions usually assist private facilities when they lack equipment for a fee. Roughly 14 percent of Belize’s health care staff work in both sectors.

== Future goals ==
Some key national health priorities include:

- Non-communicable diseases and lifestyle related problems
- HIV/AIDS
- Prevention and management of violence (domestic violence and child abuse)
- Health promotion
- Sexual and reproductive health
- Maternal and Child health (Maternal and Infant mortality, EPI)
- Epidemiology
- Health Information Systems (BHIS, Vital registration, health accounts, WinSig)
- Health sector reform
- Environmental health
- Disaster preparedness and management

== Health status ==
There are a number of health conditions prevalent in Belize. The most common conditions include: malaria, dengue fever, gastroenteritis, cholera, and HIV/AIDS. Since Belize is a developing country, many of these conditions are related to issues surrounding, infrastructure, standard of sanitation, and are reflective of the general lack of education and awareness about how these conditions are acquired and transmitted.

Historically, malaria has caused major problems in Belize. Although treatment for Malaria has improved dramatically over the years, there are still concerns about future outbreaks. Similar concerns surround dengue fever, cholera, and HIV/AIDS. Due to the relatively fragile infrastructure and low population, an outbreak of HIV/AIDS or any of the other medical conditions noted above may impact the population size as well as the human resources.

=== Child's health ===
Since the independence of the country in 1981 and with the collaboration of UNICEF and PAHO, important measures have been settled to improve the child’s health in Belize. As the result, the child mortality rate fell from 11% in 1967 to 1,23% in 2019, achieving the target 3.2 of the Sustainable Development Goal 3 from the UN’s Sustainable Development Goals (SDGs).

The socio-economical context in Belize leads to tenacious inequalities within the population affecting particularly children. Not only age, gender-based, geographical areas, ethnic groups, poverty, violence, but also natural disasters and climate change are the main risk factors for social disparities in access to health services and quality of care. In 2019, the annual report of UNICEF Belize reported than 49% of all Belizean children lived in multidimensional poverty, which affect directly their health status. The Country Programme 2017- 2021 initiated by the Belizean Government and UNICEF, aims to implement more coherent interventions, including a focus on:

- Protecting children from violence and abuses
- Safety and Justice for Children (including violence prevention, strengthen of child justice system and child rights monitoring and reporting)
- Improving access and quality of primary and secondary education
- Strengthening the social protection system
- Supporting greater and better social investments for families and children
- Enhancing national emergency preparedness, response and disaster risk reduction efforts targeting families, particularly children
- Reducing Multidimensional Poverty and Child Rights Monitoring (including Social Protection, Data Strengthening and Child and Adolescent Participation)
- Lifelong Learning (including Early Childhood Development, Adolescent Health, Nutrition, School Water, Sanitation and Hygiene)

==== Nutrition ====
Districts of Belize

In 2016, the Global Burden of Disease Collaborative Network reported that the prevalence of overweight in children aged in 2-4 reached almost 19% in Belize. Since 1990, the prevalence of overweight and obesity in children is increasing globally in the Central America Region. Belize City, the commercial centre of the country, remains the most affected where 11% of young children are considered overweight and the majority of them (9%) live in Southside, the poorest area of the city. Moreover, Cayo, Orange Walk and Toledo districts also face an increase of early childhood overweight and obesity, even in rural areas. This trend can be explained by the lack of knowledge about nutrition and the importance of a diverse diet. Healthful food is sometimes less available and often more expensive than unhealthful food. Media and advertising also play their role by encouraging family to buy high fat and sugar products and beverages. Moreover, the insufficient of physical activities contributes to overweight in children. UNICEF reported that a large number of Belizean homes do not offer enough space for children to play and move. The local beliefs and social norms of associated the body size as a health status indicator might influence overweight on children.

Prevalence of overweight in children aged 2-4 (%) in Central America
	1990	2016	Relative change
Belize	12,69%	18,85%	+49%
Costa Rica	22,79%	37,49%	+64%
El Salvador	10,44%	16,63%	+59%
Guatemala	13,71%	21,06%	+54%
Honduras	6,86%	14,59%	+113%
Nicaragua	14,38%	21,31%	+48%
Panama	10,24%	17,99%	+76%

Besides the overweight and obesity issues, 15% of the Belizean children suffer from stunting and 5% of them are underweight. In 2018, UNICEF recorded that 1/3 of children from Toledo District present a stunted growth, and most of them are part from the Maya peoples or Garifuna communities.

The nutritional issue may start very early in the child’s growth. Before and during pregnancy the mother’s health status can lead to childhood overweight or stunning. Furthermore, the poor nutritional status of mothers may affect their ability to breastfeed properly or a bad feed-responding of the child. Exclusive breastfeeding for under 6 mouths infants reached 33% in 2015, but despite an increase since 2011, efforts may strengthen to expend the breastfeeding coverage and encourage a dietary diversity after 6 mouths.

To address the nutritional issues in Belize, the Minister of Health (MoH) with the support of UNICEF, establish a new Strategic Plan based on a life cycle approach. The plan aims to settle actions focusing on:

- Ensuring that Belizean children especially from marginalizes areas (Southside in Belize city, Corozal district and Mayan and Garifuna children in Toledo), access to a high-impact education on nutrition through school feeding programmes and nutrition counselling during clinic visits.
- Supporting and promoting breastfeeding, responsive feeding and complementary food.
- Strengthening the monitoring height and weight of newborns and child to control the adequate growth.
- Strengthening the WASH programme to promote access to clean water and sanitation in homes and schools
- Encouraging physical activities

=== National concerns ===
Despite a number of challenges, the Belizean government has made significant changes to the healthcare system. As a result of these changes, Belize has shown marked improvements in a number of areas, including vaccine preventable deaths. For example, there have been no reported cases of measles since 1991 or poliomyelitis since 1987.

The last case of neonatal tetanus was reported from Stann Creek District in 1997 and the last case of non-neonatal tetanus was in a three-year-old from Orange Walk District in 1998. The last case of Congenital Rubella Syndrome was reported in 1997. The Measles-Mumps-Rubella (MMR) vaccine was introduced in 1996 and the pentavalent formulation (DPT/Hep/Hib) in 2002. In 2005, MMR coverage was 95%; BCG, DPT, OPV-3 and Hepatitis B coverage were 96%.

Some key areas of national concern include:

- High prevalence of communicable diseases such as malaria, respiratory diseases and intestinal illnesses.
- High mortality rate from non-communicable diseases. Cardiovascular diseases appear as a significant cause of death not only in the elderly but also in the productive age population of 20–49.
- An increase in health problems related to human behavior and lifestyle such as injury, road traffic accident, violence adolescent pregnancy, abortions, sexually transmitted infections, HIV/AIDS, and suicide.
- Anaemia, malnutrition, growth retardation, and diabetes.
- Limited equity in terms of access to health care and distribution of resources.
- Inefficient health care delivery system.
- Limited capacity for policy formulation and regulation of the health sector.
- Absence of a human development policy and plan.
- Limited quality assurance.
- Outdated legislations and areas of health care delivery not yet regulated.
- Limited clinical protocols for patient management.
- Limited technical operational manuals for program implementation.
