= Jarbas Barbosa =

Brazilian epidemiologist

- Born: Jarbas Barbosa da Silva Jr.
- Education: Federal University of Pernambuco
- Scientific career
- Fields: Epidemiology
- Workplaces: Pan American Health Organization

Jarbas Barbosa da Silva Jr. is a public health expert from Brazil who is currently serving as the Director of the Pan American Health Organization (PAHO) and Regional Director for the Americas of the World Health Organization (WHO); his five-year term in this position started on 1 February 2023. He replaced Carissa Etienne of Dominica, who had served has the PAHO Director since 2013.
