= Responses to the COVID-19 pandemic in June 2020 =

Sequence of major events in a virus pandemic

This article documents the chronology of the response to the COVID-19 pandemic in June 2020, which originated in Wuhan, China in December 2019. Some developments may become known or fully understood only in retrospect. Reporting on this pandemic began in December 2019.

== Reactions and measures at the United Nations ==
=== 1 June ===
The World Health Organization (WHO) published research finding that the fight against COVID-19 had severely disrupted services to prevent and treat non-communicable diseases like cancer, diabetes, and hypertension, which kill over 40 million people each year.

Dr. Michael Ryan, WHO Executive Director, highlighted that Central and South America were now ‘intense zones’ for COVID-19 transmission.

The World Tourism Organization (UNWTO) published research noting that countries were cautiously starting to ease travel restrictions.

=== 2 June ===
The President of the General Assembly, Tijani Muhammad-Bande, called for UN Member States to place human rights at the heart of their ongoing response to COVID-19 and ensure that everyone can enjoy "justice and peace".

At a UN ECOSOC Financing for Development Forum, exploring financing options to address the pandemic and mobilize the resources needed for a proactive recovery, Deputy Secretary-General Amina J. Mohammed informed delegates that 'unprecedented' financing was needed to halt a recession of 'unparalleled proportions'.

The UN High Commissioner for Human Rights called for urgent action to address "the major disproportionate impact" of COVID-19 on racial and ethnic minorities, including people of African descent.

At a virtual pledging conference for Yemen, where community transmission of the coronavirus was likely underway, the UN Secretary-General warned that the country, whose health system had collapsed, was facing a massive humanitarian crisis and was "hanging on by a thread".

Gilbert F. Houngbo, President of the International Fund for Agricultural Development, warned that due to the coronavirus, cross-border remittances will fall by 20 per cent, or $110 billion, to $445 billion, potentially causing tens of millions to fall below the poverty line and undermining progress towards fulfilling the 2030 Agenda for Sustainable Development.

=== 3 June ===
The UN Secretary-General, António Guterres, launched the latest UN policy briefing on the pandemic, which reminds countries of their obligation to protect people on the move, now more than 70 million globally, according to data from the UN refugee agency, UNHCR, expressing optimism that the COVID-19 crisis would lead to a rethinking of how the world supports refugees, migrants and internally displaced people.

UN High Commissioner for Human Rights Michelle Bachelet urged Asian-Pacific countries to honour the right to freedom of expression, following an alarming clampdown on freedom of expression during the COVID-19 crisis.

On World Bicycle Day, the World Health Organization highlighted the potential for bicycles to transform the way the world moves around and create a healthier, more sustainable future after the pandemic.

The Secretary-General appealed for greater unity and solidarity to defeat COVID-19 and build a better world in its wake, in opening remarks to an extraordinary inter-sessional summit of the 79-member Organization of African, Caribbean and Pacific States.

=== 4 June ===
Secretary-General António Guterres said in a video message to the Global Vaccine Summit that a COVID-19 vaccine in itself would not be enough, but that it must be affordable and accessible.

The UN Children's Fund (UNICEF) warned that with nearly 1.2 billion children out of school globally due to the pandemic, inherent inequalities in accessing the internet and other tools, threatened to deepen the global crisis in learning.

Independent United Nations Special Rapporteurs on the right to housing, Balakrishnan Rajagopal, and on extreme poverty, Olivier De Schutter, urged the Indian Government to urgently comply with a Supreme Court order to ensure the wellbeing of more than 100 million migrant workers, after coronavirus measures left them jobless, forcing them to travel long distances home.

=== 5 June ===
The World Health Organization, in updated guidance, stated that governments in areas with widespread COVID-19 transmission should encourage the use of non-medical masks on public transport, in shops and in other confined locations.

The Under-Secretary-General for Peace Operations warned that in the Sahel African subregion, terrorist groups were exploiting the pandemic as they increased attacks on national and international peacekeeping forces.

=== 8 June ===
The World Bank stated in its latest Global Economic Prospects report that the COVID-19 pandemic would shrink the global economy by 5.2 per cent in 2020, the deepest recession since World War Two, triggering a dramatic rise in extreme poverty.

The World Health Organization warned that the COVID-19 pandemic was worsening globally, with more than 136,000 cases recorded on 7 June, the highest ever in a single day.

=== 9 June ===
UN Secretary-General António Guterres launched his latest policy brief on the pandemic, concerning global food security, emphasizing that the dire global food security impacts of the crisis, including an additional 50 million people falling into extreme poverty, could be avoided if countries acted immediately.

The World Food Programme warned that aid and funding of more than $182 million were urgently required for millions of people in Nigeria who had been severely impacted by the effects of the coronavirus pandemic, including conflict-hit communities “on life-support” in Nigeria's north-east.

=== 10 June ===
The World Health Organization reported that research was continuing to determine how the COVID-19 virus can be transmitted by people who show no symptoms of the disease.

Secretary-General António Guterres addressed a virtual gathering of the Global Investors for Sustainable Development Alliance, warning that the “unparalleled economic shock” due to the coronavirus was putting development gains at risk.

The UN Environment Programme and partners released a new report, Global Trends in Renewable Energy Investment 2020, showing that renewable energy was more cost-effective than ever, as COVID-19 impacted the fossil fuel industry, "providing an opportunity to prioritize clean energy in national economic recovery packages and bring the world closer to meeting the goals of the Paris Agreement".

=== 11 June ===
The World Health Organization Africa regional office warned that COVID-19 was accelerating in Africa, with more than 200,000 cases and more than 5,600 deaths.

Secretary-General António Guterres informed the “High-level Thematic Debate on the Impact of Rapid Technological Change on the Sustainable Development Goals (SDGs) and Targets”, taking place in the UN General Assembly, that managing the digital divide better had become “a matter of life and death” owing to people being unable to access essential healthcare information during the pandemic.

At a virtual roundtable discussion, the Peace Operations chief, Jean-Pierre Lacroix, stressed the importance of prioritizing the UN's Action for Peacekeeping's (A4P) Women, Peace and Security (WPS) commitments during the pandemic as inequality increased as a result of the pandemic.

=== 12 June ===
Guy Ryder, Director-General of the International Labour Organization, marking the World Day Against Child Labour, warned that huge gains made towards ending child labour over the previous two decades risked being reversed by the COVID-19 pandemic.

The UN Children's Fund (UNICEF) warned that children in the Yemen, "the world's worst humanitarian disaster" urgently needed basic services, as over eight million Yemenis, nearly half of them children, directly depended on the agency for water, sanitation and hygiene (WASH) during the ongoing conflict, cholera outbreaks and pandemic, with the $479 million appeal for Yemen being less than 40 per cent funded. UNICEF warned that unless it received $30 million by the end of June, WASH operations for four million people would shut down.

The World Health Organization warned about the pandemic's impact on women, children and young people as it continued to escalate.

=== 15 June ===
The World Health Organization Director-General, Tedros Adhanom Ghebreyesus, emphasized the risk of the southern hemisphere influenza season, as “Co-circulation of COVID-19 and influenza can worsen the impact on health systems that are already overwhelmed”.

=== 16 June ===
The UNHCR warned of the worsening refugee crisis in Syria, as “another 200,000 refugees just in this period of three months who because of the impact needed emergency assistance”.

The UN's office for Latin America and the Caribbean (ECLAC), together with the Food and Agriculture Organization, proposed in a new study 10 measures to avoid increased hunger in the region, including through an “anti-hunger grant”, as they warned those living in extreme poverty in the region could surpass 83 million by the end of 2020 due to the impacts of the pandemic.

=== 17 June ===
The World Health Organization welcomed early results on use of dexamethasone in sickest COVID-19 patients, while warning it's ‘no cure-all’.

=== 19 June ===
The World Health Organization warned that the world was entering “a new and dangerous phase” of the COVID-19 pandemic, as infection rates continued to climb and over 150,000 new cases of the disease were reported the previous day, the highest single daily total to date.

Secretary-General António Guterres issued a new policy brief, the World of Work and COVID-19, concerning jobs, livelihoods and the well-being of workers, families and businesses globally, as they continued to be affected by the COVID-19 pandemic; with micro, small and medium enterprises in particular, suffering dire economic consequences.

=== 21 June ===
The UN celebrated the sixth annual International Day of Yoga, recognizing the ancient practice "as a holistic approach to health and wellbeing, and a powerful tool for dealing with the myriad stresses brought on by the COVID-19 pandemic".

The United Nations Assistance Mission to Afghanistan echoed the United Nations Secretary General's call for a global ceasefire, as it condemned 15 attacks on healthcare workers in the country recorded during the first two months of the COVID-19 pandemic.

=== 22 June ===
The World Health Organization reported the largest single-day increase in coronavirus cases over 21 June, registering more than 183,000 new infections in 24 hours, with approximately 8.8 million cases in total worldwide, with more than 465,000 deaths.

UNAIDS warned that stocks of medication for HIV patients could be exhausted within the next two months, due to higher costs as a result of lockdowns and COVID-19 border closures.

=== 23 June ===
United Nations Secretary-General António Guterres on International Widow's Day called for countries to work towards dismantling laws that discriminate against women, particularly over inheritance, as they built back from the COVID-19 pandemic.

=== 24 June ===
170 United Nations Member States and Observers endorsed the United Nations Secretary General's global ceasefire appeal during the COVID crisis.

The International Monetary Fund in its latest World Economic Outlook report warned that the economic recovery from the COVID-19 pandemic was projected to be slower than previously forecast, with growth in 2020 estimated at -4.9 per cent, or nearly two percentage points below April projections, indicating a deeper recession and slower recovery.

The World Health Organization Director-General warned that the world was on track to reach 10 million coronavirus cases within the next week, a “sober reminder” that as research continues into therapeutics and vaccines, maximum efforts were required immediately to suppress transmission and save lives.

=== 25 June ===
The United Nations Secretary-General launched the 'UN Comprehensive Response to COVID-19' a major policy document to coordinate the United Nations System to "save lives, protect societies, recover better" during and after the pandemic.

The UN Office on Drugs and Crime (UNODC) released its latest annual report, noting that over 35 million people globally now suffered from drug addiction, with the report also analyzing the far-reaching impact of the coronavirus pandemic on global drug markets.

=== 26 June ===
The World Health Organization and partners warned that more than $31 billion would be needed over the next 12 months to develop effective medicines for COVID-19, and to make them globally available to all people.

UNICEF warned in a new report that the number of malnourished children in Yemen could reach 2.4 million by the end of 2020, due to huge shortfalls in humanitarian aid funding amid the coronavirus pandemic.

=== 30 June ===
The United Nations Secretary-General called on the world to increase “financial, humanitarian and political commitments”, to help end nearly a decade of major conflict and suffering in Syria, in a message to the fourth Brussels Donor Conference.

On Social Media Day, the United Nations launched its Verified initiative, which calls on people globally to pause before sharing, to help stop the viral spread of COVID-19 misinformation.

Director-General of the International Labour Organization (ILO) Guy Ryder, commenting on new ILO data showing that working hours fell 14 per cent during the second quarter of 2020, stated that the impact of the COVID-19 crisis on jobs had been much worse than initially expected, as he appealed to governments, workers and employers to agree on a sustainable economic recovery plan to reduce the inequalities revealed by the pandemic.

== Reactions and measures in Africa ==
=== 9 June ===
Map of the WHO's regional offices and their respective operating regions. Africa; HQ: Brazzaville, Republic of the Congo Western Pacific; HQ: Manila, Philippines Eastern Mediterranean; HQ: Cairo, Egypt South East Asia; HQ: New Delhi, India Europe; HQ: Copenhagen, Denmark Americas; HQ: Washington, D.C., US

Nigeria's Minister of Health Osagie Ehanire up to 60 percent of the "mysterious" deaths reported to authorities in the state of Kano were as a result of the coronavirus.

President of Tanzania John Magufuli declared Tanzania to be free of the coronavirus.

=== 10 June ===
The Africa Centres for Disease Control and Prevention revealed that there have been more than 200,000 confirmed cases of coronavirus in Africa with over 5,000 fatalities.

Nobel Peace Prize winner Denis Mukwege has resigned as head of a coronavirus taskforce in an eastern province of the Democratic Republic of the Congo.

=== 11 June ===
According to the Africa Chief of the World Health Organization, the coronavirus pandemic is "accelerating" in the continent, with community transmission reported in more than half of all African countries. Data indicates that it took 18 days for Africa to record 200,000 cases compared to the 98 days it took for the continent to record 100,000 cases.

Rwanda will receive a further $110 million in economic loans from the International Monetary Fund to assist the country in fighting the coronavirus pandemic. The IMF has now provided Rwanda with over $220 million during the crisis.

=== 13 June ===
In Gaborone, the capital city of Botswana, the government has re-introduced a strict coronavirus lockdown after twelve new cases of the virus were confirmed in the city's hospitals.

=== 14 June ===
Sudan's airports will not reopen for another two weeks until 28 June at the earliest.

=== 17 June ===
Mining companies in the Democratic Republic of the Congo will receive financial support from the government to ease the economic consequences of the coronavirus pandemic.

=== 18 June ===
Chinese Communist Party general secretary Xi Jinping announced that some countries in Africa will not have to repay zero-interest-rate loans paid by China before the end of the year to aid the continent's recovery from the coronavirus.

=== 19 June ===
In Zimbabwe, Health Minister Obadiah Moyo was arrested for alleged corruption regarding the country's supply of protective equipment needed to combat the coronavirus outbreak. He will appear in court on 20 June.

=== 21 June ===
In Morocco, a new field hospital was set up to treat more infected people amid a surge in cases in the country.

=== 23 June ===
The first trials for a potential coronavirus vaccine have begun in South Africa, making them the first trials in the African continent. South African pharmaceutical company Aspen Pharmacare also announced that it could potentially produce 10 million dexamethasone tablets in a month.

=== 24 June ===
Finance Minister of South Africa Tito Mboweni announced that the country's economy is expected to shrink by 7.2 per cent in 2020, the largest decrease in ninety years.

=== 25 June ===
President of Senegal Macky Sall announced he would be self-isolating for two weeks after coming into contact with a person who later tested positive for COVID-19.

=== 26 June ===
Authorities in South Africa announced that casinos and cinemas will be permitted to reopen from 29 June.

=== 29 June ===
Kenya's tourism ministry revealed that the country has lost over $750 million in tourism revenues as a direct result of coronavirus restrictions.

Nigerian authorities have stated that travel between states will be allowed from 1 July, and that students due to graduate in the summer will return to school to prepare for exams.

== Reactions and measures in the Americas ==
=== 5 June ===
Governor of California Gavin Newsom announced that the state's entertainment industry can resume film, television, and music production on 12 June following a three and a half month shutdown. However, studios and labor unions will have to abide by new safety protocols issued by the California Department of Public Health to protect workers from the spread of COVID-19.

=== 9 June ===
Regional director for the World Health Organization in the Americas, Carissa Etienne, expressed concerns over surging coronavirus cases across Latin America, including in Brazil, Mexico and Peru.

In Brazil, a Supreme Federal Court judge has ordered President Jair Bolsonaro to make coronavirus data publicly available, after the health ministry removed files from the public domain at the weekend.

The National Bureau of Economic Research has announced that the United States has officially entered its first recession since 2009.

Research conducted by Harvard Medical School indicates that COVID-19 could potentially have been spreading in mainland China as early as August 2019. Researchers cited satellite images of hospital movements and search engine data; Chinese authorities promptly dismissed the claims as "ridiculous".

Venezuela's Planning Minister Ricardo Menendez reported to state media that flights carrying vital COVID-19 aid from Iran had landed in the country on Monday.

=== 10 June ===
Brazil's most populous state São Paulo has allowed shops to reopen and is preparing to reopen malls, despite Brazil having the third highest coronavirus death toll in the world. Assembly members in Rio de Janeiro have voted to start an impeachment process against Governor Wilson Witzel on suspected overpricing on purchases of ventilators and other medical supplies to fight the COVID-19 outbreak.

Flights of Guatemalan migrants from the US will resume twice a week after being suspended due to the coronavirus pandemic.

Major League Soccer in the United States will resume from 8 July by staging a tournament without spectators, according to MLS Commissioner Don Garber.

=== 11 June ===
The United Nations Conference on Trade and Development announced that international trade is predicted to fall by 27 percent in the second quarter and by 20% annually.

Passengers on Toronto's public transport system will be required to wear face coverings from 2 July.

Mayor of Mexico City Claudia Sheinbaum announced an aim of performing 100,000 tests a month at the forefront of the city's plan to ease coronavirus restrictions.

The United States Department of Labor has revealed that an additional 1.54 million Americans filed for unemployment benefits last week, bringing the total since mid-March to over 44 million. This comes as data from Johns Hopkins University suggests that there are now more than 2 million cases of coronavirus in the US.

American company Moderna revealed plans to start human trials of its coronavirus vaccines in July.

=== 12 June ===
The World Health Organization stated that coronavirus was affecting the Americas most severely, with the organisation's most senior emergency expert Mike Ryan highlighting how the virus is "highly active" in Latin America.

Canadian Prime Minister Justin Trudeau announced that it will be mandatory for airline companies to perform temperature checks on all passengers before they arrive in Canada, and that passengers with high temperatures will not be permitted to board the flight.

Governor of Puerto Rico Wanda Vázquez Garced confirmed the reopening of cinemas, gyms, beaches and churches throughout the territory from 16 June.

=== 13 June ===
Chile's Minister of Health Jaime Mañalich was replaced due to controversies surrounding the country's reporting of coronavirus cases.

Mayor of Mexico City Claudia Sheinbaum has revealed her plans to ease coronavirus lockdown restrictions in the city. Public transport and cars will be allowed to return to the roads from next week and markets, shopping centres, restaurants and places of worship will be permitted to reopen a week later at reduced capacities. Some of Mexico's administrative regions that have falling numbers of cases of coronavirus, as well as an acceptable number of spare hospital beds, will permit the gradual reopening of hotels and other leisure facilities from 22 June.

The economic adviser to US President Donald Trump, Larry Kudlow, stated that Trump's administration is not concerned about a potential second wave of coronavirus in the country.

=== 14 June ===
Chile's Finance Minister has revealed an economic stimulus package worth $12 billion to assist the country in mitigating the effects on the economy of the coronavirus pandemic.

President of El Salvador Nayib Bukele announced that the country's economy could potentially reopen in stages from 16 June, although the country's main airport will not reopen until 6 August.

In the US, players and staff in the National Basketball Association will be tested for COVID-19 every two days before the season resumes in Orlando from 23 June.

=== 15 June ===
Chile's government extended the country's "state of catastrophe" measures by 90 days in response to rapidly increasing numbers of coronavirus cases.

Governor of New York Andrew Cuomo revealed that parts of New York City in a lower state of emergency will permit gatherings of up to 25 people.

The US Food and Drug Administration reversed its decision to allow emergency authorisation for the malaria drug hydroxychloroquine after its effectiveness in treating COVID-19 was questioned by scientists.

Organisers of the 2021 Academy Awards announced that the date of the ceremony had been pushed back to 25 April from an original scheduled date of 28 February as a result of coronavirus concerns.

=== 16 June ===
Carissa Etienne, the regional director for the World Health Organization in the Americas, warned in a press conference that the COVID-19 pandemic is still accelerating in both continents.

The USA's border closures with Canada and Mexico were extended to 21 July.

Airlines in the US will reportedly ban passengers who refuse to wear a face covering on their flight.

Organisers of the 2020 US Open tennis tournament confirmed that the event would go ahead as scheduled on 31 August, although all matches will be played without spectators.

The 2020 Western Idaho Fair, the largest event in the state, was cancelled for the first time since 1935 due to the pandemic, but in a return to its roots and for the sake of manageable public health logistics plans to scale drastically down solely to 4-H and Future Farmers of America youth exhibits, competitions and sales.

=== 17 June ===
In Chile's capital of Santiago, the government imposed tighter lockdown restrictions meaning that people are only permitted to leave their homes twice a week with heavy fines if caught breaking the rules, in response to the country recording over 200,000 cases of coronavirus.

President of Honduras Juan Orlando Hernández announced that he had tested positive for COVID-19 and would subsequently work from home.

In the United States, the Navajo Nation reimposed a strict lockdown for its citizens over the weekend in response to increasing cases of coronavirus in bordering Arizona.

=== 18 June ===
President of the United States Donald Trump stated that the US would not reimpose lockdown restrictions despite a number of states reporting surges in coronavirus cases, highlighting the huge economic consequences such a measure would have.

The United States Department of Labor revealed that a further 1.5 million Americans filed for unemployment in the last week, bringing the country's total number of people who have lost their jobs during the pandemic to over 45 million.

Health authorities in the US state of California introduced a new law requiring all residents to wear face coverings outside of their homes.

Mayor of New York Bill de Blasio announced that the city will move into the second phase of reopening on 22 June after months of coronavirus lockdown restrictions. Non-essential businesses including hairdressers and offices will be allowed to reopen as part of the easing of restrictions.

=== 19 June ===
Costa Rica's Health Minister Daniel Salas announced that the country's reopening programme would be temporarily paused in response to a rise in cases of coronavirus.

Health Minister of Guatemala Hugo Monroy and three of his deputies were replaced by President of Guatemala Alejandro Giammattei.

Mayor of the District of Columbia Muriel Bowser announced that Washington D.C. will enter the second phase of its reopening plan next week, which will allow non-essential shops and restaurants to operate indoors with strict social distancing guidelines.

The United Nations Special Representative in Haiti Helen La Lime warned that the coronavirus pandemic is worsening Haiti's humanitarian situation, stating that the country was in desperate need of financial aid from the international community to stimulate the economy.

=== 20 June ===
Mayor of Mexico City Claudia Sheinbaum announced that authorities had postponed a planned reopening of the city's economy due to rising numbers of cases and a high rate of hospital bed occupancy.

=== 21 June ===
President of the United States Donald Trump told supporters at a rally in Tulsa, Oklahoma that he had asked health authorities to slow down the rate of testing for COVID-19. A spokesperson from the White House later stated that Trump had been "joking".

=== 22 June ===
The organisers of the 2021 Golden Globe Awards announced that the date of the ceremony had been pushed back to 28 February due to the coronavirus pandemic.

In New York City, restaurants reopened outdoor seating areas and retail outlets were also permitted to reopen.

=== 23 June ===
Clinical trials of a potential coronavirus vaccine developed by the University of Oxford and AstraZeneca began in Brazil, involving over 3000 participants in the cities of Rio de Janeiro and São Paulo.

=== 24 June ===
The International Monetary Fund revealed that the global economy is predicted to contract by 4.9 per cent as a direct result of the coronavirus pandemic, nearly 2 per cent more than what was predicted in April, with economic losses estimated at $12 trillion.

Apple Inc. announced that seven stores in Houston would be closed due to a rise in coronavirus cases in the US.

Governor of Washington Jay Inslee announced that it would be made mandatory for all residents to wear face coverings in public after a surge in cases.

Organisers of the New York City Marathon announced that the 2020 event would be cancelled due to the coronavirus pandemic. Governor of New York Andrew Cuomo also released a statement alongside Governor of New Jersey Phil Murphy and Governor of Connecticut Ned Lamont which stated that anybody arriving from states with high rates of coronavirus would have to undergo a mandatory 14-day quarantine upon arrival as a result of the rising cases.

=== 25 June ===
Health authorities in the US revealed that up to 20 million Americans could have contracted COVID-19 despite official figures suggesting only 2.3 million cases have been recorded.

Governor of California Gavin Newsom declared a budget emergency after the state revealed it was expecting a $54 billion budget deficit. California's Disneyland also announced that it had been forced to postpone plans for reopening on 17 July due to rising coronavirus cases in California.

Governor of Texas Greg Abbott stated that authorities had decided to temporarily pause the reopening of businesses in the state as a result of rising coronavirus cases.

American company Macy's announced that almost 4,000 staff had lost their jobs due to the economic implications of the coronavirus pandemic.

=== 26 June ===
President of Argentina Alberto Fernández announced that tighter restrictions will be implemented in the capital Buenos Aires in response to a large increase in cases.

Costa Rica's Health Minister Daniel Salas revealed that the country would reopen its borders to international travellers from certain countries with low transmission rates on 1 August. This comes as the World Bank provided a $300 million loan to the Costa Rican government to ease the economic consequences of the pandemic.

Data suggests that the Mexican economy contracted by 17 per cent as a direct result of restrictions imposed during the coronavirus pandemic, making it the largest contraction in the country's history.

Vice President of the United States Mike Pence announced that sixteen states are experiencing rises in coronavirus cases, sparking concerns over a second wave of the virus. This comes as the number of cases rose by its biggest amount to date yesterday.

American Airlines announced that flights would resume at full capacity from 1 July.

Governor of Texas Greg Abbott announced that bars will be forced to close and restaurants will have to reduce capacity as coronavirus cases surge in the state. Outdoor gatherings of more than 100 people must also be approved by the local authorities.

=== 27 June ===
Brazil's Ministry of Health announced that the country had spent $127 million to produce the coronavirus vaccine being developed by AstraZeneca and the University of Oxford.

Peruvian authorities announced the easing of lockdown restrictions in most areas of the country, including the capital Lima. Banks and supermarkets will be permitted to reopen at a reduced capacity and people will be required to wear a face covering and maintain a social distance of one metre. Despite this, the government confirmed that the country's curfew would remain in place, and that international borders would remain closed.

=== 28 June ===
Data gathered by Johns Hopkins University in the United States suggests that the global number of deaths from COVID-19 has surpassed 500,000 with over 10 million people having been infected.

St. Patrick's Cathedral in New York City reopened for Sunday Mass with a reduced capacity and strict social distancing in place.

=== 29 June ===
Governor of São Paulo João Doria announced that he is expecting approval from Brazil's federal regulator to trial a possible COVID-19 vaccine developed by Chinese company Sinovac Biotech. This comes as the World Health Organization urged federal and state authorities to work more closely to combat the pandemic in Brazil.

Canadian Prime Minister Justin Trudeau urged Canadians to be cautious as the country slowly reopens its economy.

Governor of New York Andrew Cuomo urged Donald Trump to sign an executive order making it mandatory to wear face coverings in public. Theatres in New York's Broadway extended their closures to January 2021.

Los Angeles County announced that beaches will be closed during the 4 July Independence Day holiday weekend after continued daily increases in cases.

=== 30 June ===
Canadian authorities extended the country's foreign travel ban to 31 July and the mandatory 14-day quarantine for all arriving travellers, including citizens, to 31 August to attempt to slow the spread of coronavirus.

In the United States, director of National Institute of Allergy and Infectious Diseases Anthony Fauci warned that the US could say as many as 100,000 new cases of coronavirus a day if people do not adhere to public health recommendations.

Governor of Arizona Doug Ducey ordered bars, gyms, cinemas and some other non-essential businesses to close for thirty days after increasing cases of COVID-19. Events with more than fifty people will also be banned.

Governor of New York Andrew Cuomo added a further eight states to the New York's mandatory 14-day quarantine for arriving travellers. The additional states were named as California, Georgia, Iowa, Idaho, Louisiana, Mississippi, Nevada and Tennessee.

== Reactions and measures in the Eastern Mediterranean ==
=== 9 June ===
Emirates, the national flag carrier of the United Arab Emirates, has made hundreds of pilots and cabin crew staff redundant, with some reports raising concerns that the company's workforce could potentially be reduced by a third due to a decline in air travel during the coronavirus pandemic.

=== 11 June ===
Egyptian authorities announced the reopening of some tourist destinations to international visitors from 1 July in regions of the country with lower coronavirus transmission rates.

=== 12 June ===
Beirut-Rafic Hariri International Airport in Lebanon will reopen to commercial flights from 1 July.

=== 13 June ===
President of Iran Hassan Rouhani announced that the country would reimpose coronavirus lockdown restrictions to prevent another spike of cases in the country if current rules were not followed.

=== 14 June ===
All airports in Egypt will reopen from 1 July according to the country's Aviation Minister.

In Oman, a committee has been formed by the Sultan to address the economic consequences of the coronavirus pandemic in the country.

In the Saudi Arabian capital of Riyadh, the embassies of Yemen and the Philippines will both close temporarily for disinfecting after a number of staff in both buildings tested positive for coronavirus.

=== 15 June ===
The World Health Organization and UNICEF released a joint report warning that over 50,000 children in the Middle East and North Africa could die from coronavirus.

In the Industrial Area of the Qatari capital of Doha, the necessity for entry and exit permits has been removed by authorities. Qatar also entered the first phase of easing coronavirus lockdown restrictions, whereby some non-essential shops and places of worship may be allowed to reopen.

Authorities in the United Arab Emirates announced that residents will be permitted to travel to specific locations from 23 June, although the capital Abu Dhabi extended a ban restricting movements in and out of the city for an additional week. Authorities also announced that residents will be allowed to travel to countries deemed by the government to be low-risk for coronavirus transmission from 23 June.

=== 16 June ===
The charity Amnesty International expressed its concerns over potential privacy breaches involving the coronavirus contact tracing apps used by Kuwait and Bahrain.

=== 17 June ===
A government-led study in Tunisia found that the country's economy could potentially shrink by as much as 6.7 per cent as a direct result of coronavirus restrictions, with 275,000 people expected to lose their jobs.

=== 18 June ===
The Jordanian Government revealed the results of a study suggesting that the country's unemployment rate could rise to 19 per cent and that the economy could shrink by as much as 3.5 per cent in 2020 due to the pandemic. A report from the United Nations also found that many citizens were struggling to meet basic needs.

The government of Kuwait announced that from 21 June, curfew hours will be eased and that residents with critical health conditions will be allowed to travel freely around the country. The government also said that the current Phase 1 of reopening would remain in place for an additional week.

The CEO of Qatar Airways Akbar Al Baker revealed that the company would not make purchases of any new aircraft until 2022 as a result of the financial consequences of the coronavirus pandemic.

=== 19 June ===
Mosques in the Saudi Arabian city of Mecca were announced to be reopening from 21 June after being closed three months ago due to the pandemic.

=== 20 June ===
Prime Minister of the State of Palestine Mohammad Shtayyeh announced that the cities of Hebron and Nablus would be closed to prevent further spread of coronavirus.

Authorities in Saudi Arabia confirmed that the country's curfew would be lifted on 21 June and that all economic activity will be allowed to continue.

=== 21 June ===
Authorities in Saudi Arabia lifted the country's coronavirus lockdown and allowed businesses including hairdressers and cinemas to reopen. The Ministry of Tourism of Saudi Arabia also announced plans to launch a $4 billion tourism development fund to stimulate the country's economy.

In the United Arab Emirates, international visitors will be permitted to travel to Dubai from 7 July, with all travellers required to provide evidence of a negative test for COVID-19 or be tested at the airport.

=== 22 June ===
Authorities in Saudi Arabia announced that a "very limited" Hajj would take place in July, with the pilgrimage to Mecca being exclusively for Saudi residents due to fears of coronavirus transmission if a large number of pilgrims were to attend.

In the United Arab Emirates, Abu Dhabi announced that residents can now move freely between cities in the emirate from 23 June and extended restrictions for non-residents entering the city.

=== 23 June ===
Prime Minister of Egypt Moustafa Madbouly announced that the country's night-time curfew would end on 27 June. On the same date, restaurants will be permitted to reopen at a reduced capacity and places of worship can open for daily prayers.

The government of Oman announced that malls, factories and non-essential businesses such as travel agencies and estate agents will be allowed to reopen from 24 June, although a social distance of two metres must be maintained between customers and staff.

=== 24 June ===
Health authorities in Israel reimposed lockdown restrictions in the city of Tiberias and the town of Elad after a rise in cases.

Qatar Airways announced that daily flights to the Lebanese capital of Beirut would resume from 1 July after previously being suspended due to coronavirus concerns.

=== 25 June ===
The national airline of Egypt EgyptAir announced that the company would resume domestic and international flights from July.

Prime Minister of Israel Benjamin Netanyahu stated that a number of Israeli companies would be collaborating with two private companies from the United Arab Emirates on various medical projects, including some linked to coronavirus.

=== 26 June ===
The International Monetary Fund approved a loan of $5.2 billion to aid Egypt's recovery from the coronavirus pandemic.

=== 27 June ===
Authorities in Egypt lifted some coronavirus restrictions throughout the country, including allowing the reopening of places or worship, restaurants, gyms and theatres at a reduced capacity. The country's night curfew was also lifted.

Supreme Leader of Iran Ali Khamenei warned that the country's economic crisis would be worsened if there were to be a second wave of coronavirus infections in the country.

=== 28 June ===
President of Iran Hassan Rouhani announced that the wearing of face masks will be mandatory in some parts of the country from next week. Rouhani further stated that Iran was facing the "most difficult year" in the country's history as a result of the coronavirus pandemic and the United States sanctions against Iran.

=== 29 June ===
The government of Bahrain announced that it would pay 50 per cent of wages for private firm employees damaged by the coronavirus pandemic.

Authorities in Qatar have revealed that more coronavirus restrictions will be eased from 1 July, including the reopening of restaurants, beaches, and offices at 50 per cent capacity. Gatherings of up to five people will also be permitted.

In the United Arab Emirates, it was announced that all government employees will return to work from 5 July, although social distancing measures would remain in place.

== Reactions and measures in Europe ==
=== 8 June ===
British Home Secretary Priti Patel has announced that all people entering the United Kingdom will have to provide an address where they can self-isolate for 14 days or face fines of £1,000. Travelers exempt from this ruling include anyone arriving from the Republic of Ireland, the Channel Islands or the Isle of Man, and workers in the road haulage and medical sectors providing essential care.

=== 9 June ===
Austria will reopen its border with Italy and more than 20 other European countries next week.

The Azerbaijani government announced an extension to the country's coronavirus lockdown until 1 July. Although borders will remain closed, internal flights will be permitted to resume from 15 June.

French Finance Minister Bruno Le Maire has announced 15 billion euros ($16.9 bn) in rescue money for the aviation industry, including plane manufacturer Airbus and national carrier Air France. Also in France, the Eiffel Tower will reopen to the public on 25 June after more than three months closed due to the coronavirus lockdown.

President of Romania Klaus Iohannis stated the need to extend Romania's state of alert to the middle of July, although this must be approved by the Romanian Parliament to take full effect.

Turkish President Recep Tayyip Erdoğan has lifted Turkey's stay-at-home orders for people aged over 65 and for children.

In the United Kingdom, the Office for National Statistics revealed that there have been 64,000 excess deaths in the UK during the coronavirus pandemic. Business Secretary Alok Sharma confirmed that retail outlets will be allowed to open from 15 June, with social distancing rules in place.

=== 10 June ===
In Austria, Foreign Minister Alexander Schallenberg revealed that from 16 June, there will be no checks along the Italian border and no quarantine requirements for more than 20 other European countries.

Bulgarian Prime Minister Boyko Borisov will extend the country's epidemic emergency to the end of the month in response to a rise in domestically transmitted cases.

In Denmark, the Japanese company Fujifilm has announced it will spend $928 million to expand production of COVID-19 treatments in the country.

Officials at the European Commission have announced their aim to speed up trials for coronavirus vaccines involving genetically modified organisms. Companies including AstraZeneca and Johnson and Johnson have announced they are working on potential COVID-19 vaccines.

French Finance Minister Bruno Le Maire has said that France could see 800,000 jobs in the aftermath of the pandemic, equivalent to 2.8% of the country's total employment.

Italian Prime Minister Giuseppe Conte will be questioned by prosecutors on 12 June over his handling of the coronavirus outbreak in the northern Italian, one of the country's most badly affected areas. The prosecutors are allegedly investigating why badly hit areas were not closed down faster, and have already questioned Lombardy's regional governor and health chief.

Polish Prime Minister Mateusz Morawiecki has announced that Poland will re-open borders with other European Union countries on 14 June and allow international flights from 12 June.

British Prime Minister Boris Johnson has said that the decision on the timing of the coronavirus lockdown in the UK was based on scientific evidence, in response to Professor Neil Ferguson claiming that Britain's death toll from COVID-19 could have been potentially halved if lockdown had been introduced a week earlier.

=== 11 June ===
Data from the European Asylum Support Office suggests that applications for asylum in Europe fell 87 percent in April, meaning that the total number of applications is at the lowest level since 2008.

The French Junior European Affairs Minister Amélie de Montchalin has stated that the 750 billion euro economic recovery package proposed by the European Union must be approved by the end of July, as countries around Europe deal with the financial aftermath of coronavirus lockdowns.

Airline companies in Norway are now allowed to resume flights at full capacity.

The British Secretary of State for Health and Social Care Matt Hancock has urged people not to attend Black Lives Matter protests scheduled for the weekend due to the risk of coronavirus transmission. Also in the UK, Heathrow Airport has started a voluntary redundancy scheme in response to the decline in air travel during the pandemic.

=== 12 June ===
In Norway, it was announced that travel to Iceland, Finland and the Swedish island of Gotland will resume from 15 June, although restrictions will remain in place with neighbouring Sweden.

Spanish Health Minister Salvador Illa announced the state of emergency in the region of Galicia will be lifted on 15 June, making it the first region in the country to do so.

Turkish-based Pegasus Airlines will resume international flights from 13 June.

President of Ukraine Volodymyr Zelenskyy has suspended all official engagements and will restrict his contact with other people after his wife, Olena Zelenska tested positive for COVID-19.

In the United Kingdom, data shows how the British GDP decreased by a record 20.4 percent in April alone as a direct result of restrictions imposed on businesses during the coronavirus pandemic.

=== 13 June ===
France will lift all border restrictions with other Schengen countries from 15 June, as well as gradually reopening the country's borders to non-Schengen travellers from 1 July. The news was confirmed by Foreign Minister Jean-Yves Le Drian and Interior Minister Christophe Castaner.

The Italian Health Minister Roberto Speranza announced that Italy, Germany, France and the Netherlands have reached an agreement with British pharmaceutical company AstraZeneca to supply 400 million doses of the company's coronavirus vaccines at a cost of over $800 million, with the aim of the first doses being prescribed by the end of 2020. AstraZeneca further revealed that it had entered discussions with health authorities in Brazil, China, Japan and Russia regarding the supply of the company's coronavirus vaccine.

=== 14 June ===
Austrian Economy Minister Margarete Schramböck revealed that the country plans to introduce further investment subsidies and tax breaks to help struggling businesses deal with the effects of the coronavirus pandemic.

President of France Emmanuel Macron announced that all of mainland France, including the capital Paris, will enter a lower state of alert on 15 June, meaning that restaurants and cafés can operate in normal circumstances.

Spain will reopen its borders to countries in the Schengen Area from 21 June without the need for tourists to undergo a mandatory quarantine upon arrival. The border with Portugal will reopen later on 1 July.

British Chancellor of the Exchequer Rishi Sunak announced that the government will review the 2-metre social distancing rule currently in place in the UK, over reports that suggest that millions of jobs could be saved if the distance was reduced, similar to other countries around the world. This comes as the European Director of the World Health Organization, Hans Kluge, warned that coronavirus lockdown measures in England should not be lifted further until the government's contact tracing scheme is operating more successfully.

British-based airline EasyJet announced that some domestic flights in the UK would resume from 15 June.

=== 15 June ===
Prime Minister of Finland Sanna Marin announced that the emergency powers adopted by the Finnish Parliament would be withdrawn due to falling coronavirus cases in the country. The country's state of emergency ended at midnight.

In Greece, major international airports have reopened to foreign tourists although passengers arriving from countries deemed high-risk by the European Union will have to undergo a mandatory 14 day quarantine. Bans on travellers from the UK and Turkey were extended to June 30.

North Macedonia's general election has been rescheduled to 15 July after being delayed due to coronavirus restrictions in the country.

In Spain, the Embassy of the United Kingdom in Madrid confirmed that British tourists will be allowed to travel to the country from 21 June although tourists returning to the United Kingdom must undergo a mandatory 14-day quarantine upon arrival. It was also announced that Spain was in talks with British pharmaceutical company AstraZeneca to make purchases of the company's potential coronavirus vaccine.

Swedish Health Minister Lena Hallengren has extended the country's ban on visits to nursing homes to the end of August.

In Tajikistan, non-essential businesses including malls, hotels and restaurants reopened during the first easing of coronavirus lockdown restrictions in the country.

Non-essential businesses in England including high-street shops, restaurants, places of worship and zoos reopened with strict social distancing rules in place after being closed for almost two months due to coronavirus lockdown restrictions.

=== 16 June ===
Authorities in Denmark have encouraged Black Lives Matter protesters in Copenhagen to get tested for COVID-19 after a protester tested positive for the virus.

Members of Hungary's National Assembly voted in favour of revoking emergency powers granted to Prime Minister Viktor Orbán during the coronavirus pandemic.

Turkish Health Minister Fahrettin Koca announced that it will be mandatory to wear face coverings in 42 provinces of the country.

The wife of the president of Ukraine, Olena Zelenska, has been admitted to hospital in a stable condition after testing positive for COVID-19.

In the United Kingdom, researchers at the University of Oxford published the results of studies involving the drug dexamethasone, suggesting that the drug can cause significant reductions of up to a third in coronavirus mortality rates amongst patients who require ventilator treatment, making it the first successful treatment to be found for coronavirus in the world. On the same day, the Medicines and Healthcare products Regulatory Agency instructed human trials involving the malaria drug hydroxychloroquine to cease immediately after growing concerns amongst the international community over the effectiveness of the drug in treating COVID-19.

In the UK, it was reported that more than 600,000 citizens have lost their jobs during the country's coronavirus lockdown, with the number of people claiming unemployment benefits rising by over 23 per cent to 2.8 million.

=== 17 June ===
Developers behind Germany's coronavirus contact tracing app announced that it has been downloaded 6.5 million times since its launch on 16 June. On the same day, German company CureVac announced that it was ready to begin clinical trials of a potential coronavirus vaccine, becoming the second company in the country to do so. Chancellor of Germany Angela Merkel also extended the country's ban on large events to October.

Portugal's Assembly of the Republic voted to increase the government's budget by 4.3 billion euros to aid the country's recovery from the coronavirus pandemic.

Prime Minister of Spain Pedro Sánchez announced that the country's 27,000 coronavirus victims would be honoured in a state ceremony on 16 July.

Swedish Minister for Foreign Affairs Ann Linde announced that Sweden will allow residents to travel for non-essential reasons to ten countries in the European Union from 30 June, including France, Italy and Spain.

The Premier League in England resumed without spectators after previously being suspended due to coronavirus concerns, with police urging fans not to gather outside stadiums.

Mayor of London Sadiq Khan announced he would be taking a 10 per cent pay cut in response to London's struggling financial situation as a result of the pandemic.

Researchers at Israel's Technion Institute of Technology in Haifa revealed that they had invented a reusable face mask capable of killing the coronavirus with heat by utilising the power from a mobile phone charger, the first such face mask produced worldwide.

=== 18 June ===
Czech Health Minister Adam Vojtěch announced that restrictions imposed due to coronavirus will be eased in the coming weeks to allow larger groups of people to gather and leisure attractions to reopen, as well as removing the necessity to wear face masks.

Denmark will allow citizens from Schengen countries to travel to the country from 27 June, although Portugal and Sweden won't be included due to having higher rates of infection.

The Federal Statistical Office of Germany found that the German travel industry declined by 23% in the first quarter of 2020, making it the largest decline since the Great Recession.

In Kazakhstan, non-essential shops, markets and public parks will be closed from 21 June as a result of increasing cases of coronavirus. This comes as former president of Kazakhstan Nursultan Nazarbayev tested positive for COVID-19.

The Slovenian Government announced that all travellers arriving in the country from Serbia, Kosovo and Bosnia would have to undergo a mandatory 14-day quarantine due to an increase in transmissions in the country.

The Spanish tourism industry will receive a 4.25 billion euro stimulus package to aid recovery from the pandemic.

Swedish Finance Minister Magdalena Andersson revealed that the country's economy is predicted to decrease by six per cent in 2020 due to the coronavirus pandemic.

The British Government announced that the country would switch to using a contact tracing app developed by Google and Apple after trials of the country's own app on the Isle of Wight highlighted significant problems with identifying Apple phones.

=== 19 June ===
Germany's coronavirus contact tracing app has been downloaded almost 10 million times according to government data.

Ireland's Taoiseach Leo Varadkar revealed that, from 29 June, churches, hairdressers and gyms will be allowed to reopen, with gatherings of up to 200 people outdoors and 50 people indoors also permitted. On the same date, all sporting activities will resume, and the government is expected to provide 70 million euros in economic support to businesses affected by the pandemic. Varadkar also announced that the country's mandatory 14-day quarantine for anybody arriving in the country would remain in place until at least 9 July.

Deputy Prime Minister of Poland Jadwiga Emilewicz announced that airline companies will be allowed to operate flights at full capacity from 1 July.

Swiss authorities announced that gatherings of up to 1000 people will be allowed from 22 June.

In the United Kingdom, the coronavirus alert level was lowered from Level 4 to Level 3, meaning that transmission of the virus is no longer rising.

=== 20 June ===
In France, it was announced that football stadiums will be allowed to reopen to a maximum of 5,000 spectators from 11 July.

Prime Minister of Kyrgyzstan Kubatbek Boronov announced that all public transport would cease in the capital city of Bishkek due to a rise in coronavirus cases in the city.

President of Montenegro Milo Đukanović announced that the country's general election had been scheduled for 30 August due to Montenegro having relatively few cases of the virus.

Spanish Foreign Minister Arancha González Laya announced that British tourists would be permitted to enter the country from 21 June without having to undergo a mandatory 14-day quarantine upon arrival, although any travellers arriving in the UK must still enter self-isolation. The decision was said to have been done "out of respect" for the 400,000 British citizens with homes in Spain. Prime Minister of Spain Pedro Sánchez urged the population to be cautious as the country entered the final day of its state of alert introduced in March to control the spread of coronavirus.

Swiss pharmaceutical company Novartis announced it would stop trials of the malaria drug hydroxychloroquine for potential COVID-19 treatment due to a lack of volunteers for clinical trials and data from the World Health Organization raising questions over the effectiveness of the drug.

Turkish health authorities have imposed a nationwide curfew between 9am and 3pm every day to reduce the spread of coronavirus whilst high school entry exams are being conducted.

=== 21 June ===
The final of the Adria Tour tennis tournament was cancelled after Bulgarian player Grigor Dimitrov tested positive for COVID-19.

Police in the Dutch city of The Hague reportedly arrested multiple individuals who refused to leave protests over the government's social distancing rules.

Spain's borders were reopened to international tourists from the United Kingdom and all Schengen countries, with the exception of Portugal. The country's state of emergency imposed in March as a result of coronavirus was lifted.

In the United Kingdom, Chancellor of the Exchequer Rishi Sunak revealed plans to cut Value-added tax (VAT) to reduce the economic impact of the coronavirus pandemic.

=== 22 June ===
Bulgarian Health Minister Kiril Ananiev announced that it would again be mandatory to wear face masks in indoor public spaces after a large increase in coronavirus cases in the country.

Disneyland Paris announced it would be partially reopening from 15 July with reduced visitor numbers and the requirement to wear face masks.

French Finance Minister Bruno Le Maire revealed that French and German authorities were calling for the European Recovery Fund to pay out the proposed 500 billion euros of financial aid until 2022, rather than until 2024, which was suggested by other member states.

Prime Minister of Portugal António Costa announced that some coronavirus restrictions would be reimposed in the capital Lisbon from 23 June, with new restrictions limiting social gatherings to ten people and requirements for shops and restaurants to close before 8pm.

Health officials in the United Kingdom announced that a saliva test for coronavirus would be trialled in Southampton with the aim of identifying outbreaks faster.

=== 23 June ===
The leaders of the European Union announced that they will meet in Brussels on 17 July to discuss the proposed 500 billion euros economic recovery package.

The French pharmaceutical company Sanofi stated that it aimed to get approval for its coronavirus vaccine being developed with GlaxoSmithKline in the first half of 2020.

In Germany, the State Minister of Health in North Rhine-Westphalia Karl-Josef Laumann announced that the districts of Warendorf and Guetersloh had been placed under lockdown to prevent further transmission of the virus after cases were reported at a meatpacking factory in the region. A report also found that the German economy could shrink by up to 6.5 per cent in 2020 as a direct result of the coronavirus pandemic.

In the Russian capital of Moscow, restaurants, nurseries and leisure facilities have reopened after Mayor of Moscow Sergey Sobyanin announced an easing of coronavirus lockdown restrictions two weeks ago.

Spanish health authorities announced they will trial a coronavirus tracing app on the island of La Gomera from 26 June.

British Prime Minister Boris Johnson announced the easing of several lockdown restrictions from 4 July, including allowing members of two different households to meet inside and replacing the 2-metre social distancing rule with a "1-metre-plus" approach. Most businesses will also reopen including restaurants, bars, hotels, hairdressers, cinemas and museums. However, other businesses including gyms, pools, spas and tattoo parlours will remain closed. Places of worship will be allowed to reopen and people may attend religious services. England's Chief Medical Officer Chris Whitty also stated that the virus would likely be spreading in the UK in spring 2021.

=== 24 June ===
Chancellor of Austria Sebastian Kurz advised citizens against all travel to the German state of North Rhine-Westphalia after a surge in cases linked to a meat processing plant there.

Bulgarian Health Minister Kiril Ananiev announced that Bulgaria's state of emergency will be extended to 15 July due to consistent rises in coronavirus cases.

Health authorities in Kazakhstan placed the towns of Kokshetau and Stepnogorsk in lockdown by introducing a curfew, blocking access by road and closing all non-essential venues.

Prime Minister of the Netherlands Mark Rutte announced a further easing of lockdown restrictions in the country that will see the population allowed to meet, gather outdoors and visit restaurants in groups, and travel on public transport from 1 July. He further stated that football matches will reopen to the public after the summer.

The United Kingdom's Airport Operators Association revealed that as many as 20,000 jobs could be lost at British airports due to companies' financial losses during the pandemic.

=== 25 June ===
In France, the Eiffel Tower reopened to the public with strict hygiene and social distancing measures in place. France's Minister for Youth Affairs and Sports Roxana Mărăcineanu also announced that financial assistance for the country's sports industry would be extended to September.

Shareholders in Germany's national airline Lufthansa announced their support for a 9 billion euro ($10 billion) government payout to protect the company from collapsing amidst the coronavirus pandemic, after it was reported that the airline was days away from becoming bankrupt. The agreement will see the German government take a 20 per cent share in the company, with the airline undergoing a restructuring programme to cut costs.

Kazakhstan's Health Minister Eljan Birtanov resigned, citing complications due to coronavirus.

Prime Minister of Norway Erna Solberg confirmed that Norway will reopen its borders to European countries that meet certain criteria from 15 July.

Authorities in the Greater Lisbon region in Portugal announced that a stay-at-home rule would be reimposed in a total of 19 districts from 29 June due to a rise in coronavirus cases.

Spanish authorities have extended the country's furlough scheme until 30 September in an attempt to minimise the economic implications of the pandemic.

=== 26 June ===
The Regional Director for Europe from the World Health Organization Hans Kluge warned that the continent was at the risk of a second wave of coronavirus infections after authorities identified 30 countries as having seen recent increases.

Scientists from Spain's University of Barcelona revealed that traces of COVID-19 had been identified in waste water collected in March 2019, which, if confirmed, would raise concerns over the spread of the virus before a public health emergency was confirmed in December, although authorities stated that it was most likely a contaminated sample.

=== 27 June ===
The European Union delayed a decision on a reopening of borders to tourists from outside the Schengen area. Diplomats stated that the changes could come into effect from 1 July at the earliest and that the US, Brazil and Russia would almost certainly be excluded due to high rates of infection.

Chancellor of Germany Angela Merkel urged German citizens to be cautious and adhere to restrictions as the country's economy begins to ease out of lockdown.

The British Government announced an easing of the rule requiring anyone arriving the country to enter a mandatory 14-day quarantine. Authorities stated that tourists would be allowed to visit countries deemed to have low risks of coronavirus infections, with the full list set to be released next week.

=== 28 June ===
The Irish government has stated that it will maintain a 14-day mandatory quarantine for British tourists in July.

Authorities in the Swiss city of Zürich announced that 300 people has been put in a mandatory quarantine following a surge in cases linked to a nightclub in the city.

The Turkish Interior Ministry has imposed a nationwide daytime curfew during university entrance exam season to prevent large gatherings.

British Home Secretary Priti Patel announced that the city of Leicester may be placed in a regional lockdown after it was revealed that 25 per cent of the city's coronavirus cases have been reported in the last two weeks. Such a measure would be the first of its kind in the UK.

=== 29 June ===
The minister of North Rhine-Westphalia in Germany, Armin Laschet, extended the lockdown restrictions in the district of Guetersloh by a further week, which would see non-essential businesses and leisure facilities remain closed.

President of Kazakhstan Kassym-Jomart Tokayev has reportedly instructed the Kazakh government to prepare a package of coronavirus restrictions after a sustained increase of cases and deaths in the country. He ordered hospital capacity to be increased by 50 per cent within a month and the construction of mobile testing facilities.

President of Turkey Recep Tayyip Erdoğan extended the country's wage support scheme and financial aid to lower-income households to deal with the economic consequences of the coronavirus pandemic.

British Health Secretary Matt Hancock announced that the city of Leicester has been placed in the UK's first local lockdown after 25 per cent of the city's cases were reported in the last two weeks. Under the new restrictions, non-essential businesses have been told to close and most schools will close from 2 July. Travel to and from the city was also strongly discouraged.

=== 30 June ===
The European Union revealed the 14 countries from which non-essential travel can resume from July. The countries deemed to be safe were listed as Algeria, Australia, Canada, Georgia, Japan, Montenegro, Morocco, New Zealand, Rwanda, Serbia, South Korea, Thailand, Tunisia and Uruguay. China will also be included if the government allows travellers from Europe to enter without a mandatory quarantine.

The Dutch-British company Royal Dutch Shell warned that the value of the company's assets could be cut by $22 billion due to a fall in global oil prices during the coronavirus crisis.

Spain's Institute of National Statistics revealed that the country's GDP contracted by 5.2 per cent in the first three months of the year, the largest decrease in fifty years.

The government of Uzbekistan has imposed a curfew in the capital city of Tashkent and surrounding areas after a large increase in coronavirus cases. Under new restrictions announced by the government, shopping centres will be required to close at the weekend and people will be unable to leave their homes during the night.

== Reactions and measures in South and Southeast Asia ==
=== 3 June ===
On 3 June, Malaysian Education Minister Dr Mohd Radzi Md Jidin announced that the Government would be distributing guidelines to teachers on 4 June as part of plans to reopen the education sector.

=== 6 June ===
The Malaysian Director-General of Health Noor Hisham Abdullah has advised Malaysians to wear face masks in response to a World Health Organization directive encouraging people to wear face masks. He also confirmed that the country's movement control order would remain in force since the country is still being monitored under the Prevention and Control of Infectious Diseases Act 1988. Noor Hisham also confirmed that hair and beauty saloons could reopen as long as they adhered to social distancing measures.

=== 7 June ===
Malaysian Prime Minister Muhyiddin Yassin announced that the country's movement control order would end on 9 June, with the country moving into the Recovery Movement Control Order (RMCO) phase between 10 June and 31 August. Under this arrangement, interstate travel will be allowed except for areas under Enhanced Movement Control Order (EMCO), as well as domestic tourism, barbers, beauty shops, night markets, bazaars, museums, indoor busking, fishing, and filming. Schools will reopen in stages. Large gatherings and sports involving many people will still be disallowed, as well as international travel.

=== 9 June ===
In New Delhi, India, authorities have reversed orders limiting the availability of coronavirus testing and reserving hospital beds for city residents after an objection from Prime Minister Narendra Modi.

The World Health Organization has recommended Pakistani authorities to reimpose "intermittent lockdowns" of targeted areas, stating the country did not meet the organisation's conditions for lifting restrictions.

=== 10 June ===
In Malaysia, beauty salons and hairdressers have reopened after nearly three months of lockdown. The Education Minister also announced that Malaysian schools will begin reopening in stages from 24 June. Priority will be given to students taking secondary and equivalent international leaving exams. Students will also have to adhere to social distancing measures and have their temperatures tested when entering schools.

Sri Lanka will hold parliamentary elections on 5 August after being delayed by three months due to coronavirus restrictions, after health authorities gave their approval. Commissioning chairman Mahinda Deshapriya has revealed that a mock election will be held at the weekend to test new health measures that will be implemented at polling booths and counting centres.

=== 11 June ===
The Malaysian Government announced that the country's citizens will not be allowed to make the annual Hajj pilgrimage to Mecca due to concerns over the coronavirus.

An advisor to Prime Minister of Pakistan Imran Khan announced that Pakistan's GDP is set to contract for the first time in 68 years. Health authorities have also released a statement downplaying a warning to the country from the World Health Organization after the organisation recommended Pakistani officials to reimpose a lockdown due to rising cases and death tolls.

=== 12 June ===
Residents of Male, the capital city of the Maldives, will be allowed to travel without permits from 15 June, although gatherings of more than three people remain strictly prohibited.

=== 13 June ===
Police in Nepal arrested ten individuals during protests in Kathmandu over the Nepalese government's handling of the coronavirus pandemic.

In Pakistan, over 1000 coronavirus "hotspots" were sealed off by health authorities in an attempt to control the increasing spread of COVID-19 in the country.

Researchers in Thailand will test over 100 bats caught in caves for coronavirus to gain a better understanding of the origins of the virus.

=== 14 June ===
In the Indian capital of New Delhi, 500 railway coaches will serve as field hospitals and authorities will conduct house-to-house health surveys to attempt to control the increasing spread of the coronavirus in the city.

=== 15 June ===
India reimposed lockdowns in Chennai and other areas in the state of Tamil Nadu due to a rise in coronavirus cases.

Malaysian Senior Minister Ismail Sabri Yaakob announced that all 5,230 non-Muslim places of worship would be allowed to reopen but would have to implement social distancing guidelines including taking one-third of their usual capacity and requiring attendees to download the MySejahtera application.

=== 16 June ===
Pakistan's health authorities will implement strict coronavirus lockdowns in certain neighbourhoods of twenty cities found to be at an increased risk of an accelerated spread of the virus.

=== 18 June ===
An adviser to Prime Minister of Pakistan Imran Khan announced that international flights to and from Pakistan will resume at a 25 per cent capacity with strict social distancing rules to allow the expatriation of Pakistani citizens stranded abroad during the pandemic.

Thailand's aviation authorities stated that international travel to the country may be allowed to resume from July if cases continue to fall.

=== 20 June ===
The United States Department of State revealed that a number of employees of the American Embassy in Afghanistan's capital city of Kabul had tested positive for coronavirus and that the embassy was taking measures to prevent further transmission of the virus.

International flights to and from Pakistan resumed after being suspended for over three months due to coronavirus.

=== 23 June ===
The Malaysian Ministry of Education has shortened both mid-year and end-of-the-year holidays to help schools better plan lessons that had been disrupted by the COVID-19 pandemic and lockdown. The mid-term break would be reduced from nine days to five days. The end of the year holidays would be reduced from 42 to 43 days to 14–13 days depending on states. The Education Ministry confirmed that the 2020 school year will now total 168 days. In response, former Education Minister Maszlee Malik criticised the Ministry for not consulting with teachers and teachers' unions prior to amending the school calendar.

Zafar Mirza, a health adviser to Prime Minister of Pakistan Imran Khan announced that authorities have identified 500 coronavirus hotspots around the country which could have some lockdown measures reimposed to contain the spread of the virus.

The Red Cross announced that it would provide 800,000 face coverings to people in vulnerable categories in Thailand.

=== 24 June ===
President of the Maldives Ibrahim Mohamed Solih announced that international tourists from all countries will be allowed to enter the Maldives from 15 July.

The airline Emirates suspended flights from Pakistan after a number of passengers tested positive for COVID-19.

=== 25 June ===
Health authorities in the Indian capital of New Delhi announced that all 29 million residents of the city would complete a survey regarding their health, with the aim of identifying as many potential cases of the virus as possible.

=== 27 June ===
Pakistan's Minister for Science and Technology Fawad Chaudhry announced that the country has started producing locally designed ventilators.

President of Sri Lanka Gotabaya Rajapaksa lifted the country's coronavirus lockdown after a sustained drop in the number of cases, with one official stating that there was "no community transmission" in the country.

=== 29 June ===
Authorities in Thailand announced that international flights to and from the country will resume from 1 July, and that pubs and bars will be permitted to reopen on the same date.

== Reactions and measures in the Western Pacific ==
=== 1 June ===
In New Zealand, Microbiologist and health adviser Dr. Siouxsie Wiles, Deputy Prime Minister Winston Peters, and ACT Party leader David Seymour have criticized protesters who attended protests in several centers including Auckland and Wellington for flouting social distancing restrictions. Dr Wiles called for people who attended the BLM marches and gatherings to self-isolate for 14 days. Peters and Seymour also called for the New Zealand Government to move from alert level 2 to level 1.

=== 2 June ===
Singapore Airlines has announced that it will resume passenger flights to the New Zealand cities of Auckland and Christchurch on a weekly basis. In addition, the Singaporean national carrier announced that it will be resuming flights to the Australian cities of Adelaide, Melbourne, and Brisbane while establishing new routes to Sydney between 8 June and 31 July.

=== 3 June ===
New Zealand Prime Minister Jacinda Ardern announced that the Government would consider moving into an Alert level 1 lockdown on 8 June. She clarified that Alert level 1 would involve the elimination of social distancing restrictions on shops, restaurants, public transportation and public gatherings including religious services, funerals, weddings, and community sports events. However, event organisers would have to ensure contact tracing.

=== 8 June ===
New Zealand Prime Minister Jacinda Ardern announced that the country would be entering into Alert level 1 at midnight on 9 June after it was reported that the country's last remaining active case had recovered. Under an Alert level 1 lockdown, social distancing would stop with no restrictions on daily life, business activities, mass gatherings, and public transportation but the country's borders would remain closed to most international travel.

=== 9 June ===
Hong Kong will allow some students from mainland China to return to resume schooling from 15 June in a selective easing of coronavirus border restrictions. Students will be subjected to temperature screening and submission of health declaration forms in Hong Kong and Shenzhen as they commute to school.

In Indonesia, governor of Jakarta Anies Baswedan has stated that he is confident that coronavirus is under control and that the Indonesian capital can cope with a relaxation of lockdown restrictions that began on 7 June.

=== 10 June ===
Australia's Trade Minister announced that the Australian economy, facing its first recession in thirty years due to the coronavirus, will suffer if Chinese students heeded a warning from their government to not travel to the country because of racist incidents. International education is Australia's fourth largest foreign exchange earner, worth $26 billion annually. Bill Rawlinson, a senior medical virologist at New South Wales' Ministry of Health has said that Australia will have largely eradicated the coronavirus by July.

In the Chinese city of Wuhan, US authorities have announced they will soon resume operations at their consulate based in the city, after the US State Department withdrew staff and their families in late January upon the news that the Chinese government would put the city under a lockdown.

The CEO of the Tokyo 2020 Olympics, Toshiro Muto has said that the rearranged Olympics will not "be done with grand splendour", but will be simplified. The Games were postponed in March.

=== 11 June ===
China's Foreign Ministry dismissed a report from the European Union which suggested that Chinese officials were spreading misinformation about the coronavirus.

=== 12 June ===
Prime Minister of Australia Scott Morrison has urged leaders of the country's states and territories to reopen internal borders to help the Australian economy to recover after coronavirus restrictions were lifted.

South Korean Health Minister Park Neung-hoo warned that the country's health authorities will extend social distancing rules until newly confirmed cases of coronavirus fall into single figures daily. He also stated that stricter lockdown rules may be re-introduced if newly confirmed cases do not fall to the required level.

In the Thai capital of Bangkok, the Wat Pho temple, a popular tourist attraction, will not reopen to foreign visitors due to concerns over a potential increase in domestically transmitted cases, although Thai tourists will be permitted to visit the temple.

=== 13 June ===
Health officials in the Chinese capital of Beijing closed a street market after the National Health Commission recorded six new domestically transmitted cases, with two of the infected confirmed to have visited the market. Residents in the Fengtai District of Beijing were also placed under lockdown in response to the newly confirmed cases.

=== 14 June ===
In response to an outbreak resulting in dozens of new cases in Beijing, authorities in Beijing have stepped testing, contact tracing, ordered companies to impose a 14-day quarantine for employees who have visited the Xinfadi market, and locked down neighbourhoods.

A regular China Southern Airlines flight between Dhaka and Guangzhou will be suspended for four weeks from 22 June after passengers from the flight on June 11 tested positive for COVID-19.

=== 15 June ===
A further ten neighbourhoods in the Haidian District of the Chinese capital Beijing were placed into lockdown after a sudden rise in infections linked to a wholesale market were reported to authorities.

Hong Kong Disneyland announced that the attraction will reopen to visitors on 18 June.

Japan's Ministry of Foreign Affairs said the Japanese government had not made a decision to ease the country's coronavirus entry ban.

President of the Philippines Rodrigo Duterte confirmed that some coronavirus lockdown restrictions would remain in place in Manila for a further two weeks, whilst also reimposing a full lockdown in Cebu City due to a rise in cases.

In Singapore, the government announced that most businesses will be allowed to reopen from 19 June.

=== 16 June ===
In the Chinese capital of Beijing, schools have been forced to close in response to a new outbreak of coronavirus at a wholesale market in the city, and more neighbourhoods surrounding the Haidian District have been placed under lockdown in response to the outbreak, with half of Beijing's districts reporting new cases. In the city of Shanghai, travellers from regions in China deemed to be at a medium or high risk of coronavirus will have to undergo a mandatory 14-day quarantine upon arrival.

Hong Kong's Department of Health announced that groups of up to fifty people will be allowed from 19 June.

Schools in regions of Indonesia deemed to be at a lower risk of coronavirus will begin a phased reopening in July.

Air New Zealand announced that it would be resuming flights between Auckland and Shanghai from 22 June. That same day, the New Zealand Government suspended compassionate exemptions for travelers after two women who had visited the country in June to attend a funeral tested positive for COVID-19.

In Singapore, scientists at Duke-NUS Medical School will begin clinical trials of a potential coronavirus vaccine in August after successful trials on animals.

=== 17 June ===
New Zealand Prime Minister Jacinda Ardern announced that the New Zealand Defence Force's Assistant Chief of Defence Air commodore Darryn Webb will oversee the country's border and quarantine isolation facilities after two women, who had been granted compassionate exemptions to attend a funeral, tested positive for COVID-19 the previous day.

=== 18 June ===
Australian national carrier Qantas announced that most international flights scheduled before October had been cancelled after the Australian government suggested that the country's borders may be closed until 2021.

Prime Minister of Japan Shinzo Abe announced that travellers from Australia, New Zealand, Thailand and Vietnam will be allowed to enter the country in the coming weeks.

New Zealand Director-general of Health Ashley Bloomfield announced that all travelers on trans-Tasman flights will be required to wear face masks in response to three new imported cases resulting from overseas travel.

=== 19 June ===
Authorities in Beijing stated that the coronavirus outbreak in the city was under control, after a sudden increase in cases linked to a wholesale market were reported over a week ago. Authorities also revealed that a potential coronavirus vaccine being developed by Chinese company Clover Biopharmaceuticals had reached clinical trials on human volunteers.

Shinzo Abe announced that all domestic travel restrictions in Japan would be lifted with immediate effect, with residents actively encouraged to engage in leisure activities that will aid the country's economic recovery from the pandemic.

In Singapore, non-essential businesses including gyms and restaurants reopened, with gatherings of up to five people also permitted.

=== 20 June ===
Premier of Victoria Daniel Andrews announced that the state would reimpose some restrictions after sustained rises in coronavirus cases. Andrews revealed that as part of the tightened restrictions, outdoor gatherings will be limited to ten people, and that areas that are deemed to be hotspots for the virus could have stricter restrictions imposed.

=== 21 June ===
Health authorities in the Australian state of Victoria announced that the state of emergency would be extended to 19 July due to a rise in coronavirus infections.

Chinese health officials announced that frozen meat imports from American company Tyson Foods would be suspended indefinitely after positive cases of COVID-19 were reported at the company's factory in the US. A PepsiCo factory in Beijing was also ordered to close after employees tested positive. This comes as authorities in Beijing revealed that the city now had the capacity to test 1 million people a day for coronavirus.

Researchers at the Peking Union Medical College announced that they have started the second phase of human trials for a potential coronavirus vaccine.

=== 22 June ===
New Zealand Prime Minister Jacinda Ardern has announced that the New Zealand Government would be requiring people to test negative for COVID-19 before leaving quarantine. The Government also extended the ban on cruise ships beyond 30 June. While cargo ships and fishing vessels will be allowed to dock, any ship crew arriving in New Zealand would need to spend 14 days in quarantine if they had not been on the vessel for 28 days prior to docking.

Mayor of Seoul Park Won-soon announced that city authorities would impose stricter measures if the number of new daily infections did not fall below thirty in the coming days. This comes as South Korean officials stated that the country was experiencing a second wave of infections.

=== 23 June ===
Health officials in Beijing announced that the city's daily testing capacity will be increased to over 300,000 after a number of cases linked to a wholesale market were reported.

The manager of Tokyo Disneyland revealed that the park will reopen on 1 July.

In South Korea, officials in the city of Daegu announced they would be taking legal action against the Shincheonji Church of Jesus, claiming that the church contributed significantly to the spread of COVID-19 in the city and failed to implement restrictions when instructed by authorities.

=== 24 June ===
Health authorities in the Australian state of Victoria announced that 1,000 Australian Defence Force personnel will be deployed to Melbourne to deal with a recent spike in coronavirus cases.

Authorities in the Chinese capital of Beijing announced that the city's recent outbreak of coronavirus was under control.

President of the Philippines Rodrigo Duterte revealed that the Philippine government was planning a 4.3 trillion peso ($86 billion) budget for 2021 to aid the country's economic recovery from the coronavirus pandemic.

=== 25 June ===
Australia's national airline Qantas announced that a further 6,000 staff will lose their jobs at the company as the airline struggles to deal with the economic implications of the coronavirus pandemic.

Indonesia's Ministry of Environment and Forestry announced that protection for Indonesian rainforest had been scaled back as part of budget cuts caused by the coronavirus pandemic, during the season most vulnerable to forest fires.

=== 26 June ===
The Chinese capital of Beijing partially lifted the coronavirus lockdown in place in districts affected by an outbreak linked to a wholesale market in the city.

The Secretary-General of ASEAN Lim Jock Hoi announced that the region's economy was predicted to contract for the first time in 22 years after Prime Minister of Vietnam Nguyễn Xuân Phúc warned that the pandemic had "swept away the successes of recent years".

=== 28 June ===
The Australian state of Victoria announced that mandatory coronavirus tests for arriving travellers would be introduced after a sharp spike in infections.

Authorities in China have placed 400,000 under a strict coronavirus lockdown in Anxin County in the state of Hebei after a surge in cases near the capital of Beijing related to a wholesale market, meaning only essential workers will be permitted to leave their homes and that non-residents will not be allowed to enter buildings or communities.

Singaporean Prime Minister Lee Hsien Loong and Malaysian Prime Minister Muhyiddin Yassin have agreed that their governments will work together to establish a Periodic Commuting Arrangement (PCA) allowing residents from both nations who hold long-term immigration passes for business and work purposes in the other country to periodically return to their home countries for short-term home leave.

Authorities in South Korea announced that fans will be allowed to attend some sports fixtures at a limited capacity.

=== 29 June ===
Director-General of the World Health Organization Tedros Adhanom has said that a team from the World Health Organization will be sent to China in the coming weeks to investigate the origins of the COVID-19 after pressure from the international community.

New Zealand Health Minister David Clark has announced that the New Zealand Government will be investing NZ$150 million in personal protective equipment and requiring returnees in isolation facilities to wear face masks.

=== 30 June ===
Victorian Premier Daniel Andrews has announced that a lockdown will be re-imposed on ten postcodes in Melbourne for two weeks from 11:59 pm on 1 July in response to a spike of new cases in the city.

== See also ==
- Timeline of the COVID-19 pandemic
