= Merceline =

Merceline is a feminine given name. Notable people with the name include:

- Merceline Dahl-Regis, Bahamian physician and public health expert
- Merceline Wayodi (born 1995), Kenyan footballer

== See also ==
- Madeleine (name)
