= Dangriga Hospital =

Coordinates: 16.962491°N 88.238178°W

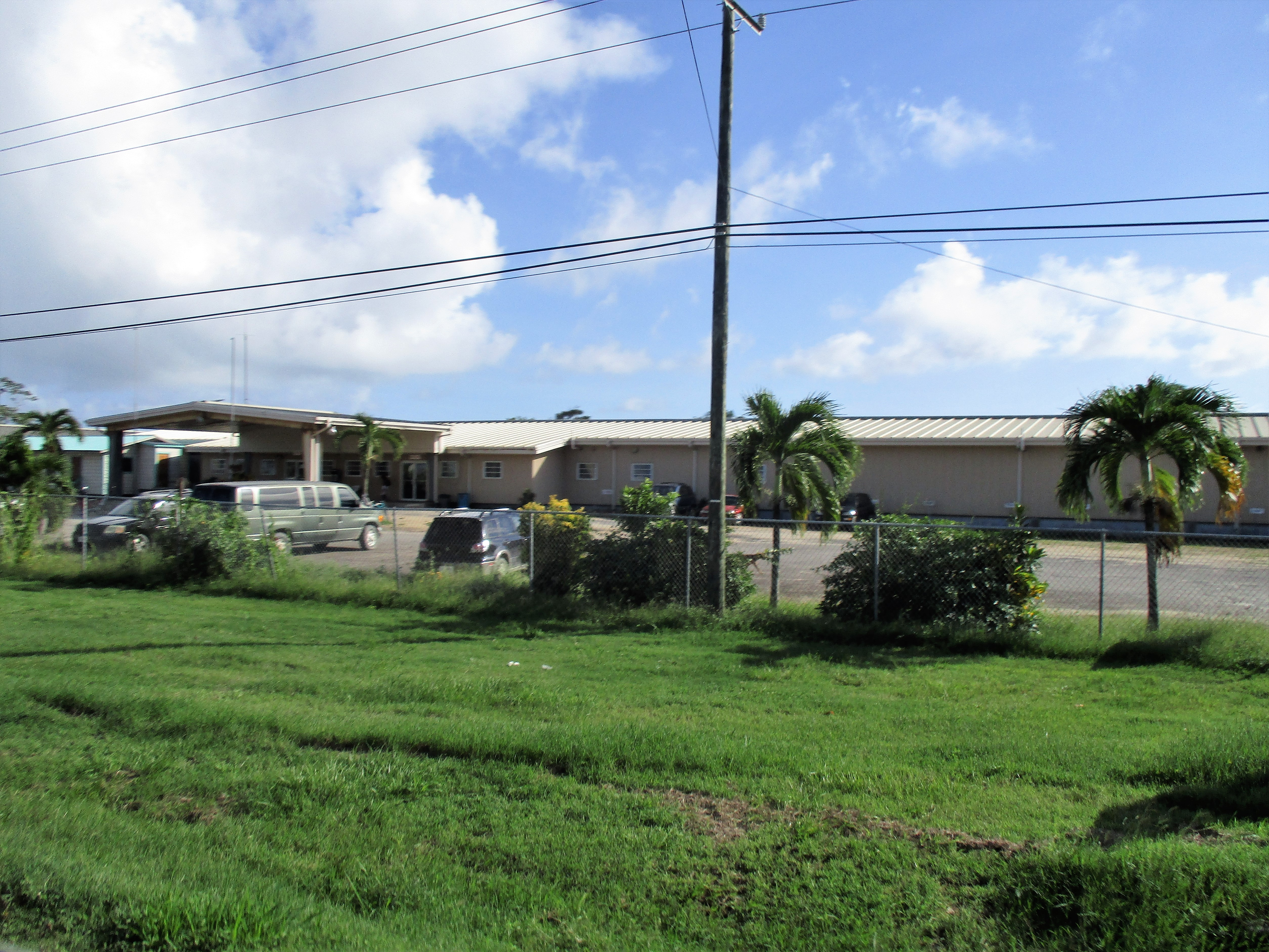

Geography
- Location: Belize

Services
- Beds: 52

Links
- Lists: Hospitals in Belize

Southern Regional Hospital (formerly Dangriga Hospital) is a hospital serving Dangriga, Belize. It has 52 beds.
