= Uniting for Health Innovation =

Non-governmental organization

PAHO Foundation
- Formation: September 5, 1968
- Founded at: Atlanta, Georgia
- Type: non government organization
- Purpose: respond to existing and emerging health threats in the Americas

UFHI (Uniting for Health Innovation), formerly the PAHO Foundation, is a non-government organization whose purpose is to respond to existing and emerging health threats in the Americas.

UFHI was established by the Pan American Health Organization on September 5, 1968 under the name Pan American Health and Education Foundation (PAHEF). It is based in Atlanta, Georgia. As of 2020 PAHO had severed ties with the Foundation and "commenced an arbitration proceeding seeking an injunction against the Foundation's ongoing unauthorized use of PAHO's name."

UFHI works with its partners to identify and engage relevant stakeholders to develop programs, mobilize public and private sector resources, share knowledge, and convene and collaborate to improve the conditions in which people are born, grow, live, work, and age. The goal is building healthier, more secure futures for families, communities, and countries across the Americas.
