= Elimination Initiative =

The Regional Initiative for the Elimination of Mother-to-Child Transmission of HIV and Congenital Syphilis in Latin America and the Caribbean, also known as the "Elimination Initiative", is a multi-agency effort to integrate the services of prevention and diagnosis of HIV and syphilis within the framework of primary care services, prenatal, sexual, reproductive and family health. Typically, prevention of the mother-to-child transmission of HIV and congenital syphilis has been addressed separately.

The initiative was launched in 2009 by UNICEF, PAHO, the Latin American Center for Perinatology (CLAP) and partner organizations in Latin America and the Caribbean and intends to eliminate the mother-to-child transmission of HIV and of congenital syphilis in the region by 2015.

== Objectives ==
The main objective of this initiative is to eliminate congenital syphilis and mother-to-child transmission of HIV in Latin America and the Caribbean by 2015. Strategies and action plans related to the initiatives will be implemented in the Region beginning 2009 until 2015. To achieve their main goal, the initiative proposes an integrated approach to prevention; improve the prenatal coverage, diagnosis and early treatment of pregnant women in the region. It also recognizes the need to reinforce the integration of primary health care systems and improve information systems.

Specific targets set for 2015 are as follows:

1. Reduction of mother-to-child transmission of HIV to 2% or less.
2. Reduction of the incidence of mother-to-child transmission of HIV infection to roughly 0.3 cases per 1,000 live births.
3. Reduction of incidence of congenital syphilis to 0.5 cases or less, including stillbirths per 1,000 live births.

== History ==
- 2004: The Regional Plan of HIV/STI was presented to the Health Sector 2006–2015, during the PAHO 46th Meeting of the Directing Council;
- 2005: PAHO published the frame of reference for the elimination of the congenital syphilis in the Americas;
- 2007: The CARICOM health ministers endorse the Elimination Initiative;
- 2009 (December): Publication of basic documents of the Elimination Initiative: the Concept Paper, Clinical Guidelines, and Regional Monitoring Strategy:
- 2010 (March): The Global Fund to Fight AIDS, Tuberculosis and Malaria launched a report in which estimates that the elimination of mother-to-child transmission of HIV for 2015 is an attainable goal;
- 2010 (April): The World Health Organization launched a document that urges the international community to establish new and more ambitious objectives that promote the progress toward the elimination of child HIV for 2015.
