= Ruth Rice Puffer =

American biostatistician

- Born: August 31, 1907; Berlin, Massachusetts,
- Died: September 2, 2002 (aged 95)
- Education: Harvard School of Public Health; Smith College
- Scientific career
- Fields: Biostatistics
- Workplaces: Pan American Health Organization

Ruth Rice Puffer (August 31, 1907 – September 2, 2002) was an American biostatistician who headed the Department of Health Statistics of the Pan American Health Organization, where she led the Inter-American Investigation of Childhood Mortality.

== Life ==
Puffer was born in Berlin, Massachusetts, and went to Hudson High School (Massachusetts). She graduated from Smith College in 1929, began working with Edgar Bright Wilson in the Harvard School of Public Health, and in 1933 moved to Nashville, Tennessee, to become director of statistics in the Tennessee Department of Public Health. After additional graduate study with Wade Hampton Frost at Johns Hopkins University, she returned to Harvard and obtained a doctorate in public health (unusually, without also having completed an M.D.) in 1943. She published her dissertation research on tuberculosis as a book through the Harvard University Press.

After completing her doctorate, Puffer returned to Tennessee, but her interest in international health statistics was sparked by a 1946 lecture tour in Chile, and a return visit there in 1950. From 1953 to 1970, she worked with the Pan American Health Organization. During her time at the PAHO, she headed two investigations into Pan American childhood mortality-- this work continued as she was hired by the organization as a contractor in 1971. Since that time, she continued to work as a consultant, including trips to India, Thailand, and Indonesia. She moved to Corvallis, Oregon in 1982, and to McMinnville, Oregon, where she died, in 2002.

== Recognition ==
Puffer was elected as a Fellow of the American Statistical Association in 1966. In 1970, Smith College gave her an honorary doctorate, and in 1977, the Tennessee Department of Public Health gave her their Centennial Award for outstanding service. In 1978, she won the Abraham Horwitz Award for Inter-American Health. In 2002 on the occasion of the 100th anniversary of the Pan American Health Organization, the organization listed her as one of 100 "public health heroes".

== Books ==
Puffer was the author of:

- Familial Susceptibility to Tuberculosis: Its Importance as a Public Health Problem (Harvard University Press, 1944)
- Practical Statistics in Health and Medical Work (McGraw-Hill, 1950)
- Patterns of Urban Mortality (with G. Wynne Griffith, Pan American Health Organization, 1967)
- Patterns of Mortality in Childhood (Pan American Health Organization, 1973)
