= List of hospitals in Belize =

List of hospitals in Belize include the follow:

- Belize Medical Associates, Belize City
- Belmopan Hospital, Cayo
- Corozal Community Hospital, Corozal
- Dangriga Hospital
- Karl Heusner Memorial Hospital, Belize City
- La Loma Luz Hospital, Santa Elena
- Northern Regional Hospital, Orange Walk
- Punta Gorda Hospital, Toledo
- San Ignacio Community Hospital, Cayo
- Southern Regional Hospital, Stann Creek
- Western Regional Hospital, Belmopan
