= Esther Ayuso =

Belizean architect

- Born: Esther Josefina Ayuso; November 1958 (age 67); Caracas, Venezuela
- Other names: Esther Ayuso Ramirez
- Occupations: Architect, architectural theorist, women's rights advocate
- Years active: 1983-present
- Known for: first female Belizean architect

Esther Ayuso, OBE (born November 1958) is the first female Belizean architect. She is known for her designs to improve hospitals in Belize including Belize Medical Associates, the Cleopatra White Polyclinic, Matron Robert polyclinic, the Hoy Eye Clinic and the PICU/NICU wing of Karl Heusner Memorial Hospital due to be completed in 2015. She has served as a Senator and as the Chair of the National Women's Commission, as well as the Belizean delegate to the Inter-American Commission of Women. In 2015 she was awarded the Most Excellent Order of the British Empire for contributions to the community.

== Early life and education ==
Esther Josefina Ayuso was born in Caracas, Venezuela, to Josefina (née Medero), a banking clerk, and Oscar Ayuso, a Belizean banking official with the Royal Bank of Canada. Shortly after her birth, the family returned to Belize City in British Honduras. There she would later attend St. Catherine’s Academy High School, graduating in 1975. That same year she travelled to Caracas with the aim of becoming an architect, but due to differing matriculation requirements for Venezuelan colleges, she was told she had to resit several high-school level courses to successfully secure admission and study at Universidad Central de Venezuela. She diligently pursued all necessary entry requirements, completing all necessary coursework in just two years and securing entry into the architectural program at UCV. In 1983 she graduated with a technological architectural degree. Returning to Belize, she was unable to find immediate work and returned to Venezuela in 1983. There she met and married a fellow architect, with whom she welcomed two sons in 1990 and 1991, respectively. The family remained in Caracas until the 1992 Venezuelan coup d'état attempts. Returning to her home country of Belize, Ayuso initially secured employment at Professional Engineering Services as an architectural associate, where she remained until 1995 when she and her husband opened their private architectural practice, Arcade Ltd. Besides residences, Ayuso is known for her public works projects which include the expansion of Belize Medical Associates from a small private clinic into a hospital; remodeling of the Cleopatra White and Matron Robert polyclinics; and work on the Hoy Eye Clinic and several branches of Atlantic Bank Ltd. In 1996, the couple welcomed their third son. During Hurricane Keith in 2000, Arcade Ltd. suffered severe damages and the couple shifted their attention and expertise to the field of architectural and construction consultation.

In 2006, Ayuso was appointed by Prime Minister Dean Barrow to serve as a Senator. In 2008, after serving two years on the Senate, Ayuso was appointed chair of the newly organized National Women's Commission (NWC). That same year she was also appointed to serve as Belize's delegate to the Inter-American Commission of Women, a post she still maintains. Under her leadership of the NWC, the commission undertook a study to update the National Gender Policy, held several symposia on developing a Gender Studies program in Belize, and conducted a Women in Politics Project to educate women about politics and holding elected office.

Ayuso was one of the founding members of the Belize City Local Building Authority that was organized in 2009. The Authority was created to stabilize building code enforcement and help the city council draft zoning and safety regulations. In 2011, ground was broken for a Pediatric intensive care unit at Karl Heusner Memorial Hospital, which was designed by Ayuso. It is projected that the construction will be completed and the PICU and NICU wings will be fully operational by December 2015.

In 2015 Ayuso was appointed an Officer of The Order of the British Empire for contributions to the Belizean community and her dedication to women's rights.
