= Pan American Health Organization =

Public health agency for the Americas

Pan American Health Organization Organización Panamericana de la Salud (Spanish) Organização Pan-Americana da Saúde (Portuguese)
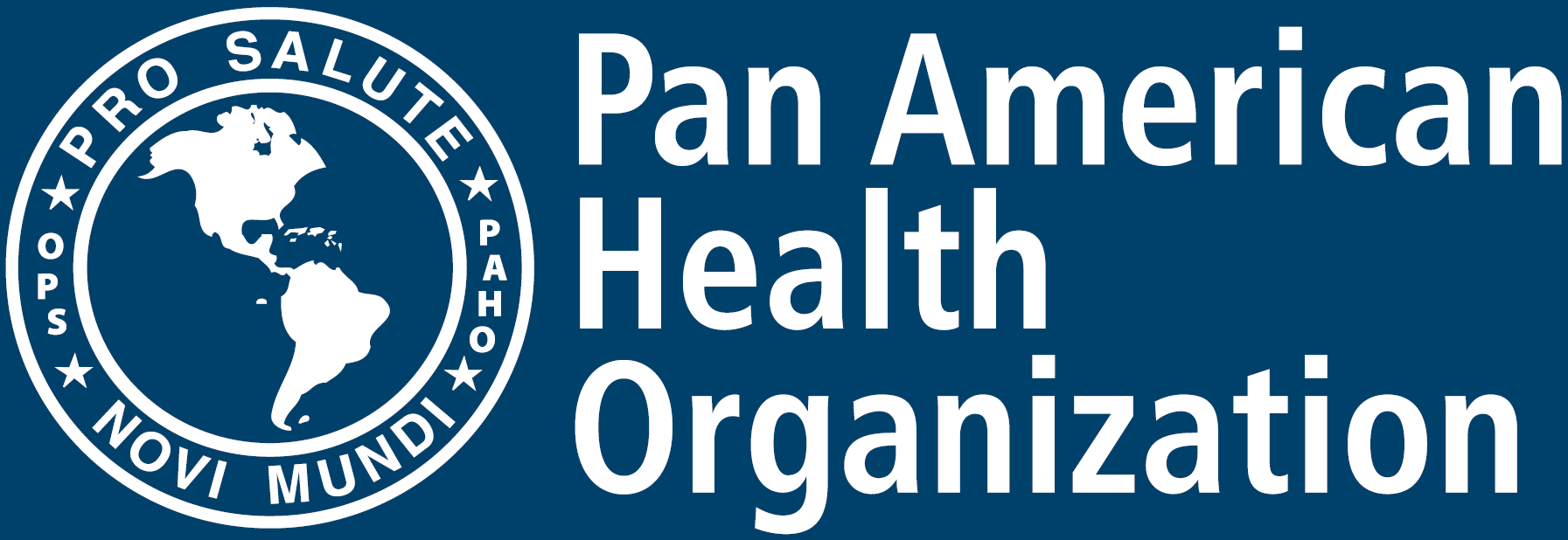
- Logo of the Pan American Health Organization

- Flag of the World Health Organization
- Abbreviation: PAHO; OPS; OPAS
- Formation: 1902; 124 years ago
- Type: Specialized agency of the United Nations and Organization of American States
- Headquarters: Washington, D.C., United States
- Website: www.paho.org

Pan American Health Organization
- Membership: 35 Member States and 4 Associate Members in the Americas

Leaders
  - Director: Jarbas Barbosa
  - Deputy Director: Mary Lou Valdez
  - Assistant Director: Rhonda Sealey-Thomas
  - Director of Administration: Kristan Beck
- Establishment: 2 December 1902
- Website www.paho.org

The Pan American Health Organization (PAHO) is a specialized agency of the United Nations (UN) in charge of international health cooperation in the Americas. It fosters technical cooperation among member countries to fight communicable and noncommunicable diseases, strengthen health systems, and respond to emergencies and disasters.

PAHO has 35 Member States and four Associate Members in the region. Headquartered in Washington, D.C., PAHO is the regional office for the World Health Organization in the Americas, and the health organization of the Inter-American System. It is known in Latin America as the OPS (Spanish: Organización Panamericana de la Salud) or OPAS (Portuguese: Organização Pan-Americana da Saúde).

== Description ==
PAHO has scientific and technical expertise at its headquarters, in its 27 country offices, and its three Pan American centers, all working with the countries of the Americas in dealing with priority health issues. The health authorities of PAHO's Member States set PAHO's technical and administrative policies through its governing bodies. The PAHO Member States include all 35 countries in the Americas; Puerto Rico is an associate member. France, the Kingdom of the Netherlands, and the United Kingdom of Great Britain and Northern Ireland are the participating states, and Portugal and Spain are the observer states.

The Organization's mission is to strengthen national and local health systems and improve the health of the peoples of the Americas, in collaboration with Ministries of Health, other government and international agencies, nongovernmental organizations, universities, social security agencies, community groups, and many others.

PAHO promotes universal health coverage and universal access to health and strengthening of health systems based on primary health care strategies. It assists countries in fighting infectious diseases such as malaria, cholera, dengue, HIV and tuberculosis as well as the region's growing epidemic of noncommunicable diseases such as cardiovascular disease, cancer and diabetes. PAHO engages in technical cooperation with ministries of health and facilitates coordination with other sectors to promote health in all policies. PAHO also promotes the use of research evidence to inform health care decisions and policymaking through the implementation of knowledge translation strategies such as the Evidence-Informed Policy Network (EVIPNet). Through the Elimination Initiative, it targets HIV/AIDS.

Specific initiatives spearheaded by PAHO include the expanded program on immunization, which played a major role in the elimination of smallpox and polio from the Americas; the Tobacco-Free Americas initiative; the Regional Coalition for Water and Sanitation to Eliminate Cholera in Hispaniola; the Salt Smart Consortium; the Pan American Network for Drug Regulatory Harmonization; and a blood safety initiative that seeks to improve blood safety and efficiency by helping countries reach 100% blood supplies from unpaid voluntary donors.

The Pan American approach is a part of PAHO history and the spirit of pan-Americanism continues to stimulate technical cooperation among countries in health. PAHO has helped countries work together toward common goals, and to initiate multi-country health ventures in Central America, the Caribbean, the Andean Region, and the Southern Cone. Experience has shown practical benefits such as the solidarity that helped Central America after hurricane Mitch, and there are numerous other examples. Health collaboration found expression at the highest political level when American heads of state in their Summit in Santiago accepted a health initiative called "Health Technology Linking the Americas".

The countries of Latin America and the Caribbean joined together over 20 years ago to buy vaccines through a revolving fund. These are among the Organization's most notable successes, starting with the eradication of smallpox from the Americas in 1973, a triumph followed five years later by global eradication of the dreaded disease.

A major effort committing the Americas to embark on polio eradication in 1985 succeeded in September 1994, when a distinguished International Commission declared the Americas officially polio-free. The last case of polio in the Americas was identified on August 23, 1991, in a young boy named Luis Fermín Tenorio Cortez, in Junín, Peru. Since then, despite intensive surveillance, no cases of polio have been detected anywhere in the Americas, and the World Health Organization is now working toward the goal of eradicating polio globally. PAHO assists the countries in mobilizing the necessary resources to provide immunization and treatment services for all vaccine-preventable diseases. PAHO is close to accomplishing the goal of eliminating measles from this hemisphere and is pressing on with the introduction of new vaccines that are currently available, such as Haemophilus influenzae B. to reduce meningitis and respiratory infections. PAHO works to reduce the toll of death and illness from diarrheal diseases, including cholera, through case management and oral rehydration therapy to prevent deaths from dehydration, and to provide adequate diagnosis and treatment of acute respiratory infections, thus saving the lives of hundreds of thousands of children each year.

The Organization provides technical collaboration in a variety of specialized public health fields and organizes emergency preparedness and disaster relief coordination. It supports efforts to strengthen national health systems, develop national health research systems, control malaria, Chagas' disease, urban rabies, leprosy, and other diseases that affect the people of the Americas. PAHO collaborates with governments, other agencies, and private groups to address major nutritional problems including protein-energy malnutrition, and is now working to eliminate iodine and vitamin A deficiencies.

PAHO engages in and facilitates health promotion to help countries deal with health problems typical of development and urbanization, especially non-communicable diseases (NCDs) such as cardiovascular diseases, cancer, accidents, smoking, addiction to drugs and alcohol, and injuries among others. Beyond health promotion, PAHO also addresses health systems and quality of care issues in support of national efforts to respond to the NCD pandemic. The Organization also executes projects for other United Nations agencies, for international organizations such as the World Bank and Inter-American Development Bank, for official development cooperation agencies of various governments, and for philanthropic foundations.

The Organization recognizes the role of the private sector in the delivery of services and fosters dialogue and partnerships with the Ministries of Health. In addition to its core budget financed by quota contributions from its Member Governments, PAHO also seeks outside funding to help implement special programs and initiatives in response to vital health needs. Voluntary tax-deductible contributions for PAHO health and education projects in the Americas may be made to the PAHO Foundation.

Dr. Jarbas Barbosa of Brazil was elected as PAHO Director on September 28, 2022, and took office on January 31, 2023. PAHO's Deputy Director is Dr. Mary Lou Valdez, of the United States, and the Assistant Director is Marcos Espinal, from the Dominican Republic.

== History ==
The organization was founded in December 1902. It was originally called the Pan-American Sanitary Bureau. It has been described as the world's first international public health organization.

In 1949, PAHO and WHO signed an agreement making PAHO the American Regional Office (AMRO) of WHO. Today the usual phrasing is "Regional Office for the Americas". The first hemisphere-wide effort to eradicate smallpox was made in 1950 by the PAHO. The campaign was successful in eliminating smallpox from all countries of the Americas except Argentina, Brazil, Colombia, and Ecuador.

In October 2024, health authorities in the Americas expanded PAHO's funding to help the Organization accelerate access to health technologies, particularly in response to public health emergencies and disease outbreaks.

== Headquarters building ==
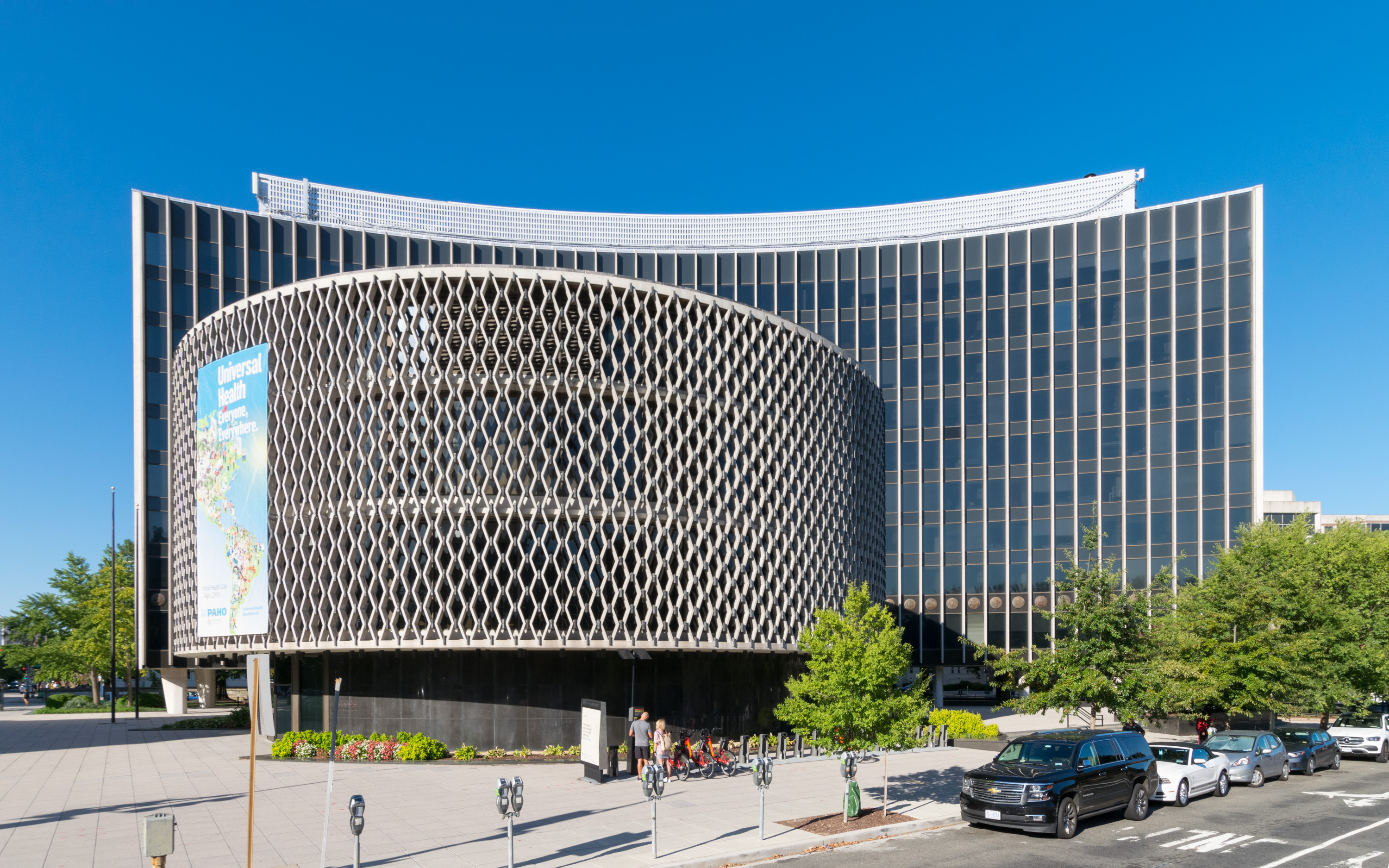
Pan American Health Organization building, Washington, DC

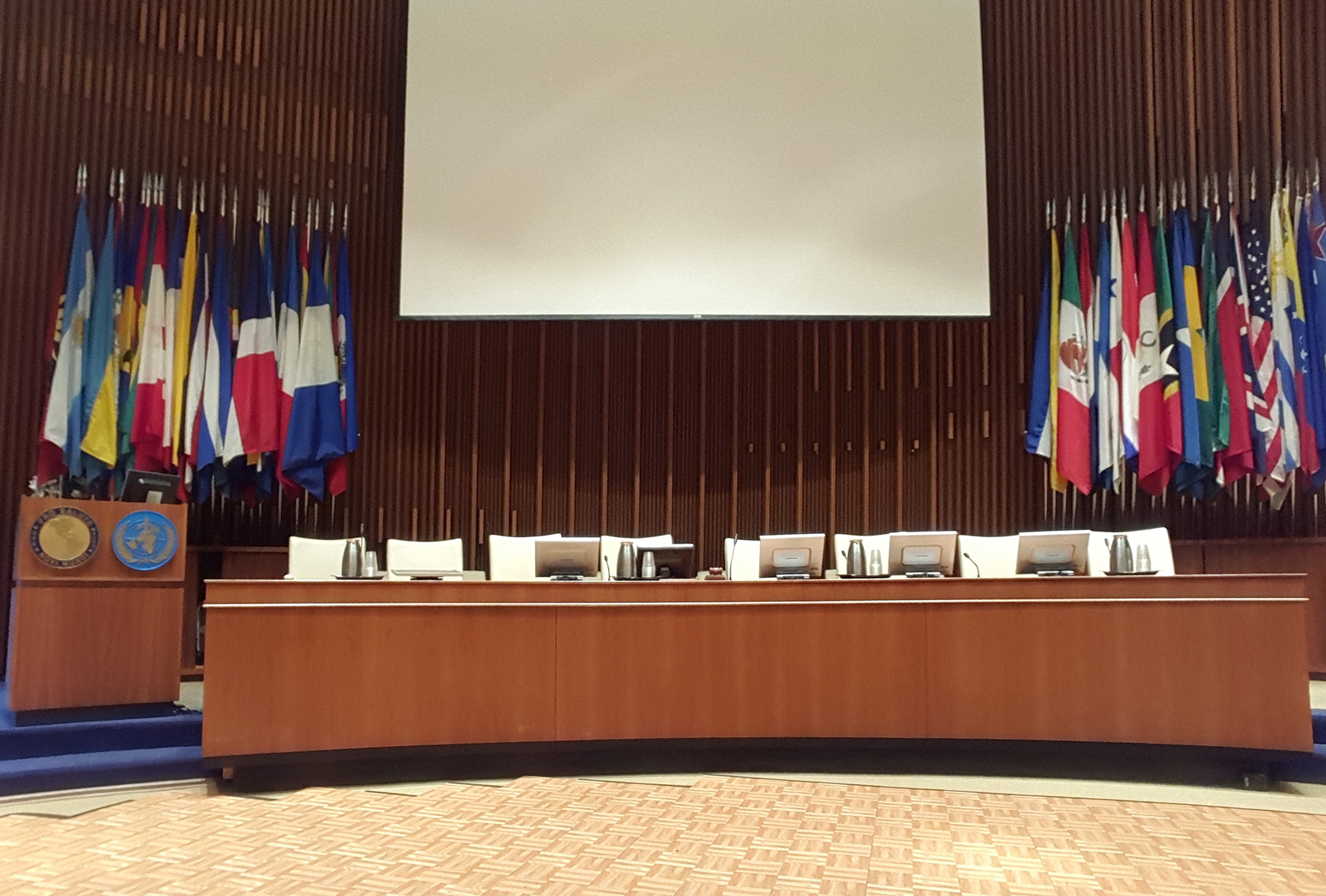
Stage of the Pan-American Health Organization building Auditorium in Washington, DC

In March 1960, President Eisenhower signed into law a bill passed by the U.S. Congress authorizing the U.S. government to purchase and donate a lot for the PAHO headquarters in Washington, D.C. After a competitive bid, in October 1961, the PAHO declared Uruguayan architect Román Fresnedo Siri the winner of its competition. At the ceremony announcing him as a winner, the organization's Director Abraham Horwitz said "this beautiful building will become a monument to the ideal of better health for the peoples of the Americas." He described the winning design as one of "both grace and utility", and said, "it reflects the high ideals of the Pan-American spirit in an age when we must move ahead to build a better future for our peoples."

The building was designed in a modernist style. Constructed in 1965, the exterior features 29 round bronze seals of the founding nations of the Pan American Health Organization, designed by American sculptor Michael Lantz. In 1993 the seals were surveyed by the Smithsonian Institution's Save Outdoor Sculpture! program and were described as needing conservation treatment.

Constructed of reinforced concrete over a steel frame with an exterior of glass and marble, the building is one of Washington's most recognized examples of midcentury modern architecture. The building is divided into two distinct volumes: a gracefully curved ten-story building that hosts the organization's main offices, and an adjoining four-story cylindrical annex that serves as the congress hall for formal assemblies of the PAHO member state delegates, as well as other meetings and events. It is surrounded by George Washington University to the north and east, the Columbia Plaza office/residential complex to the west, and the State Department to the south across the E street expressway underpass.

== List of directors-general ==
Source: Official website

Name	Years of Tenure
(United States) Walter Wyman	1902–1911
(United States) Rupert Blue	1912–1920
(United States) Hugh Smith Cumming	1920–1947
(United States) Fred Lowe Soper	1947–1959
(Chile) Abraham Horwitz	1959–1975
(Mexico) Héctor Acuña Monteverde	1975–1983
(Brazil) Carlyle Guerra de Macedo	1983–1995
(Barbados) George Alleyne	1995–2003
(Argentina) Mirta Roses Periago	2003–2013
(Dominica) Carissa Etienne	2013–2023
(Brazil) Jarbas Barbosa	2023–

== Members ==
Member states:

- Antigua and Barbuda (1982)
- Argentina (1937)
- Bahamas (1974)
- Barbados (1967)
- Belize (1982)
- Bolivia (1929)
- Brazil (1929)
- Canada (1971)
- Chile (1929)
- Colombia (1933)
- Costa Rica (1926)
- Cuba (1925)
- Dominica (1981)
- Dominican Republic (1929)
- Ecuador (1930)
- El Salvador (1926)
- Grenada (1977)
- Guatemala (1933)
- Guyana (1967)
- Haiti (1926)
- Honduras (1957)
- Jamaica (1962)
- Mexico (1929)
- Nicaragua (1925)
- Panama (1929)
- Paraguay (1939)
- Peru (1926)
- Saint Lucia (1980)
- St. Vincent and the Grenadines (1981)
- St. Kitts and Nevis (1984)
- Suriname (1976)
- Trinidad and Tobago (1963)
- United States of America (1925)
- Uruguay (1928)
- Venezuela (1933)

Participating states:

- France (1951)
- The Netherlands (1951)
- United Kingdom (1951)

Associate members:

- Aruba (2012)
- Curaçao (2012)
- Puerto Rico (1992)
- Sint Maarten (2012)

Observer states:

- Spain (1980)
- Portugal (1986)

== Public Health Heroes of the Americas ==
PAHO recognizes individuals as "Public Health Heroes" to honour noteworthy contributions to public health in the Americas. On the occasion of its 100th anniversary in 2002, PAHO named 12 individuals to the list. The award is considered PAHO's highest honour.

=== List of honourees, by year ===
- 2018 - Dr. Tabaré Vázquez, Uruguay
- 2018 - Dr. Merceline Dahl-Regis, Bahamas
- 2015 - Dr. María Isabel Rodríguez, El Salvador
- 2014 - Dr. Ciro de Quadros, Brazil
- 2012 - Dr. David Tejada de Rivero, Peru
- 2002 - Dr. José Jordán, Cuba
- 2002 - Dr. Zilda Arns Neumann, Brazil
- 2002 - Dr. Carlos Canseco González, Mexico
- 2002 - Dr. Jacinto Convit, Venezuela
- 2002 - Dr. Myrna Cunningham, Nicaragua
- 2002 - Dr. José Roberto Ferreira, Brazil
- 2002 - Hon. Marc Lalonde, Canada
- 2002 - Dr. Donald A. Henderson, US
- 2002 - Dr. Edgar Mohs, Costa Rica
- 2002 - Dr. Elsa Moreno, Argentina
- 2002 - Dr. Ruth Puffer, US
- 2002 - Sir Kenneth Standard, Barbados

== See also ==
- Guatemala syphilis experiment
- Pan American Journal of Public Health
- Vaccination Week In The Americas
