= Merceline Dahl-Regis =

Bahamian public health expert (active 1960s–)

Merceline Dahl-Regis, CMG OD, is a Bahamian physician and public health expert. She is the former Chief Medical Officer of the Bahamas and has been recognized for her role in advancing public health in the Caribbean and internationally.

== Biography ==
Dahl-Regis earned her medical degree from the University of West Indies in the 1960s, becoming one of the first women to graduate in medicine in the Bahamas. She earned a degree in public health from Johns Hopkins University. She completed a residency in paediatrics at Howard University, where she subsequently accepted a faculty position.

Returning home to the Bahamas, Dahl-Regis obtained a position at Princess Margaret Hospital. She was appointed Chief Medical Officer of the Bahamas in 1997. In 2009, Dahl-Regis was awarded the Pan American Health Organization Award for Administration, for her contributions to health care management, research, and medical education. She was credited for her innovations to the public health system, including the introduction of non-medical administrators to public health clinics so that medical staff could focus on delivering health care. She was also recognized for her management of a malaria outbreak within the tourism industry.

In 2010, Dahl-Regis was appointed to chair an international expert committee responsible for verifying the elimination of measles, rubella and congenital rubella syndrome in the Americas. In 2016, the committee declared the Americas free of endemic measles, following a 22-year vaccination drive.

In 2018, Dahl-Regis was presented with the PAHO Public Health Hero of the Americas award. At the ceremony, Bahamian Prime Minister Hubert Minnis commended Dahl-Regis on her efforts to eliminate vaccine-preventable diseases. The same year, she was named an Officer of the Bahamian Order of Distinction.

In 2020, during the global COVID-19 pandemic, Dahl-Regis coordinated the Bahamian government's COVID-19 task force.

== Selected works ==
- Dahl-Regis, M. M.; Jayam-Trouth, A. (1986). "Fetal alcohol syndrome and myasthenia gravis". Journal of the National Medical Association. 78 (11): 1111, 1115–1117. ISSN 0027-9684. PMC 2571423. PMID 3641931.
- Hayford, S. M.; Epps, R. P.; Dahl-Regis, M. (1988). "Behavior and development patterns in children born to heroin-addicted and methadone-addicted mothers". Journal of the National Medical Association. 80 (11): 1197–1200. ISSN 0027-9684. PMC 2571530. PMID 2470912.
- Dahl-Regis, M. M.; Oyefara, B. I. (1990). "Boarder babies: children with special health needs". Journal of the National Medical Association. 82 (7): 473–477. ISSN 0027-9684. PMC 2626955. PMID 2398506.
- Irons, B.; Lewis, M. J.; Dahl-Regis, M.; Castillo-Solórzano, C.; Carrasco, P. A.; de Quadros, C. A. (2000). "Strategies to eradicate rubella in the English-speaking Caribbean". American Journal of Public Health. 90 (10): 1545–1549. doi:10.2105/ajph.90.10.1545. ISSN 0090-0036. PMC 1446383. PMID 11029986.
