= Belize Medical Associates =

Geography
- Location: 5791 St. Thomas Street, Kings' Park, Belize City, Belize
- Coordinates: 17.508°N 88.194°W

Services
- Beds: 25

History
- Founded: 1988

Links
- Lists: Hospitals in Belize

Belize Medical Associates is a private hospital in Belize City, Belize. It was developed in 1988, as a single clinic. A decade after they opened, in 1998, they changed from a private clinic into a small hospital featuring two surgical theaters and 18 beds. Belize's first female architect, Esther Ayuso worked on the hospital expansion. By 2010, a subsequent expansion had created space for 25 beds.

== Facilities ==
The hospital is located at 5791 St. Thomas Street, Kings Park in Belize City.

It currently provides:

- 24-hour emergency service
- Modern 25-bed Hospital
- Well Stocked Pharmacy
- Advanced Laboratory
- Modern radiology services
- Fully equipped operating theater
- Multi-specialist & Primary Care Clinics
- Cardiac Care Unit
- Neurological Unit

Its stated mission is

"To provide the Highest Quality Health Care Service in Belize that is Complete, Affordable and done in an Ethical Manner."
