= Carissa Etienne =

Dominican public health expert (1952–2023)

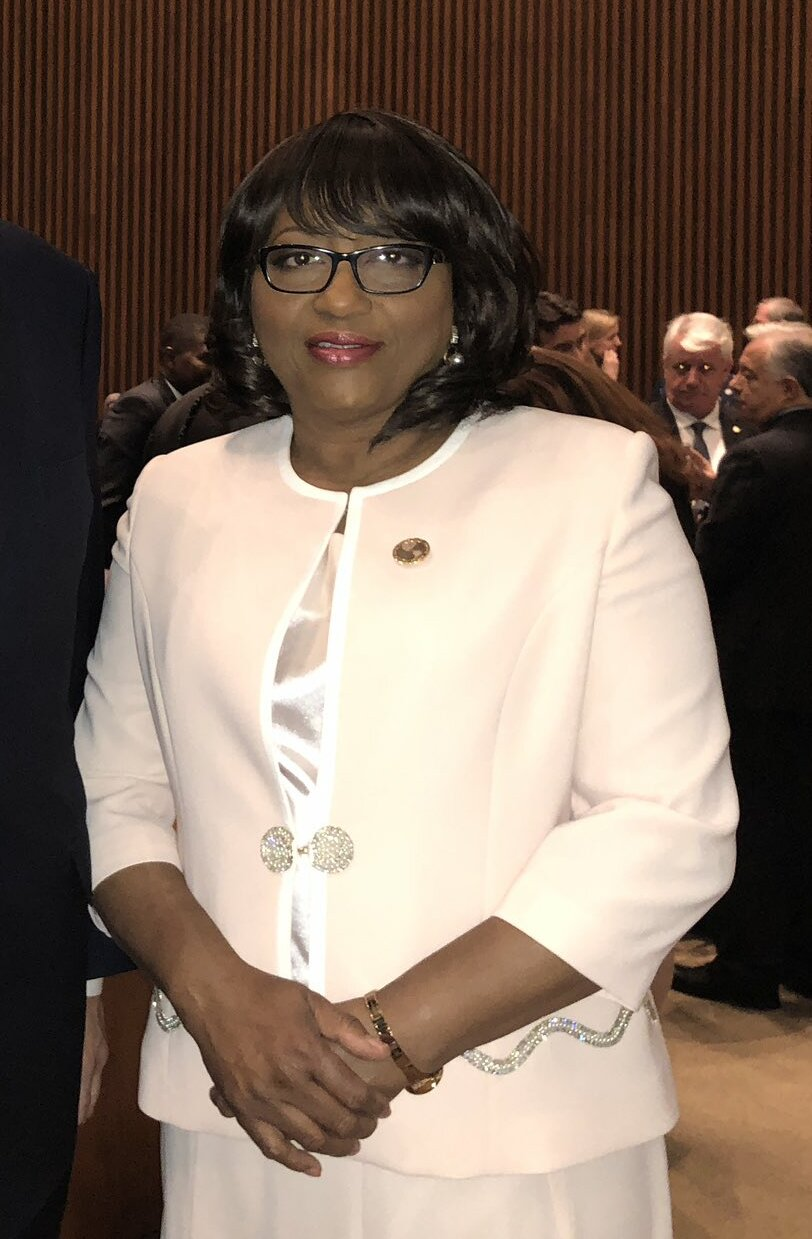
- Etienne in 2018
- Born: Carissa Faustina Etienne; 2 November 1952; British Leeward Islands
- Died: 1 December 2023 (aged 71); United States
- Education: University of the West Indies
- Occupations: Doctor; Public health expert

Carissa Faustina Etienne (2 November 1952 – 1 December 2023) was a Dominican public health expert. She served as the director of the Pan American Health Organization (PAHO) and regional director for the Americas of the World Health Organization (WHO) (2018–2023). Up to her death, she was in her second five-year term as PAHO director, having been re-elected by the PAHO member states during the Pan American Sanitary Conference in September 2017. In January 2018, she was named Regional Director for the Americas for WHO by its Executive Board based in Geneva. She was an advocate for universal health coverage.

== Early life and education ==
Etienne graduated with a degree in Medicine and Surgery (MBBS) from the University of the West Indies in Jamaica. She held a master's degree in community health from the London School of Hygiene & Tropical Medicine, UK.

== Career ==
Etienne started her career as a medical officer in the Princess Margaret Hospital in Dominica. She was director of primary health care services, disaster coordinator, national epidemiologist in the Ministry of Health, coordinator of the National AIDS Program, chair of the National AIDS Committee, and had two separate terms as chief medical officer.

Etienne was the assistant director of PAHO from 2003 to 2008. She served as the assistant director-general of health systems and services at the World Health Organization in 2008–12. She was elected PAHO director in September 2012 and took up the position, which has a five-year term, in February 2013. She also served as honorary vice-president of the American Public Health Association.

On 27 September 2017, Etienne was re-elected for a second five-year term as director of PAHO by the member states of the organization. On 23 January 2018 the WHO Executive Board appointed her for a second term as WHO Regional Director for Americas.

Etienne is credited for leading efforts by the World Health Organization's Pan American bureau, PAHO, to combat the COVID-19 pandemic in the Americas. She is also credited for the organization's campaigns against cholera and yellow fever outbreaks in the countries of Haiti and Brazil. Dr. Etienne also lead PAHO's efforts against the Zika virus and Chikungunya epidemics in the Americas.

== Death ==
Etienne died in the United States on 1 December 2023, at the age of 71.
