= Audrey Cheng =

Taiwanese-American entrepreneur

- Born: 1993 (age 32–33); Maryland
- Education: Northwestern University
- Occupation: Entrepreneur

Audrey Cheng (born 1993) is an American entrepreneur. She founded the Moringa School, which provides training in computer science to students from Kenya and Rwanda.

== Early life and education ==
Audrey Cheng was born and raised in Maryland in 1993 to Taiwanese first generation immigrants. Following high school, she went to college at Northwestern University located in Chicago where she received her degree in journalism and global health. While still in college she began working as a journalist writing about various startups in Chicago. Cheng received her degree from Northwestern University in 2015.

== Career ==
A year later, 2014, she realized she wanted to change the trajectory of her path and make her own difference in the world. Leading her to begin working for a venture capitalist company called Savannah Fund based in Kenya. Cheng soon discovered from the International Labour Organization that a big chunk of college graduates are unemployed and that only 1% of computer science majors find jobs in their field because a lot of programs they learn in school do not accurately prepare them for the fast changing technological world. Audrey also realized companies in Kenya were having a hard time finding people with the right skills to fill positions.

=== Moringa School ===
Cheng founded the Moringa School located in Nairobi, Kenya. She created a learning accelerator, a program where she would teach recent IT graduates the basic technological skills like coding needed to obtain a job in that industry. The basis of the program is to equip students with the right skills needed for companies to hire them. Not only does this program benefit the students but it also helps various companies in Kenya progress vastly because they now have the right people with the right skills to advance their companies. 95% of the school's graduates have received jobs at formidable companies not just in Kenya but throughout Africa and the world. The program has allowed students to not only receive their first job but also double their salary within a month by supplying them skills needed to succeed. Throughout her seven years leading the school, she developed and guided a team of over 100 people to train over 4000 students in both Kenya and Rwanda. Cheng has expanded her learning accelerator program to places like Hong Kong, Pakistan, Ghana, Nigeria and South Africa.

== Achievements ==
In 2016, Cheng was featured in Forbes 30 under 30 for her social innovation of creating the learner accelerator and the Moringa School. Some of the other achievements she received for her innovation is being featured in Cartier's Women's initiative, in 2016 the World Economic Forum recognized her as one of the top five women innovators in Africa, and in 2018 the company itself was recognized as one of the most innovative companies in Africa. The Moringa School continues to operate and has set a goal by 2030 to train over 200,000 students with the skills needed to advance themselves in the technological sphere.

In March 2021, Cheng stepped down as CEO but still operates on the board of directors for the school where she will continue to advance educational programs all over Africa. She is currently a member of I&P's Education to Employment Fund where they are working to create and fund a three year program to advance educational institutions and companies to help provide students with the right skills to launch their careers and become successful focusing in Côte d'Ivoire, Ghana and Senegal.
