= Global health =

Health of populations in a global context

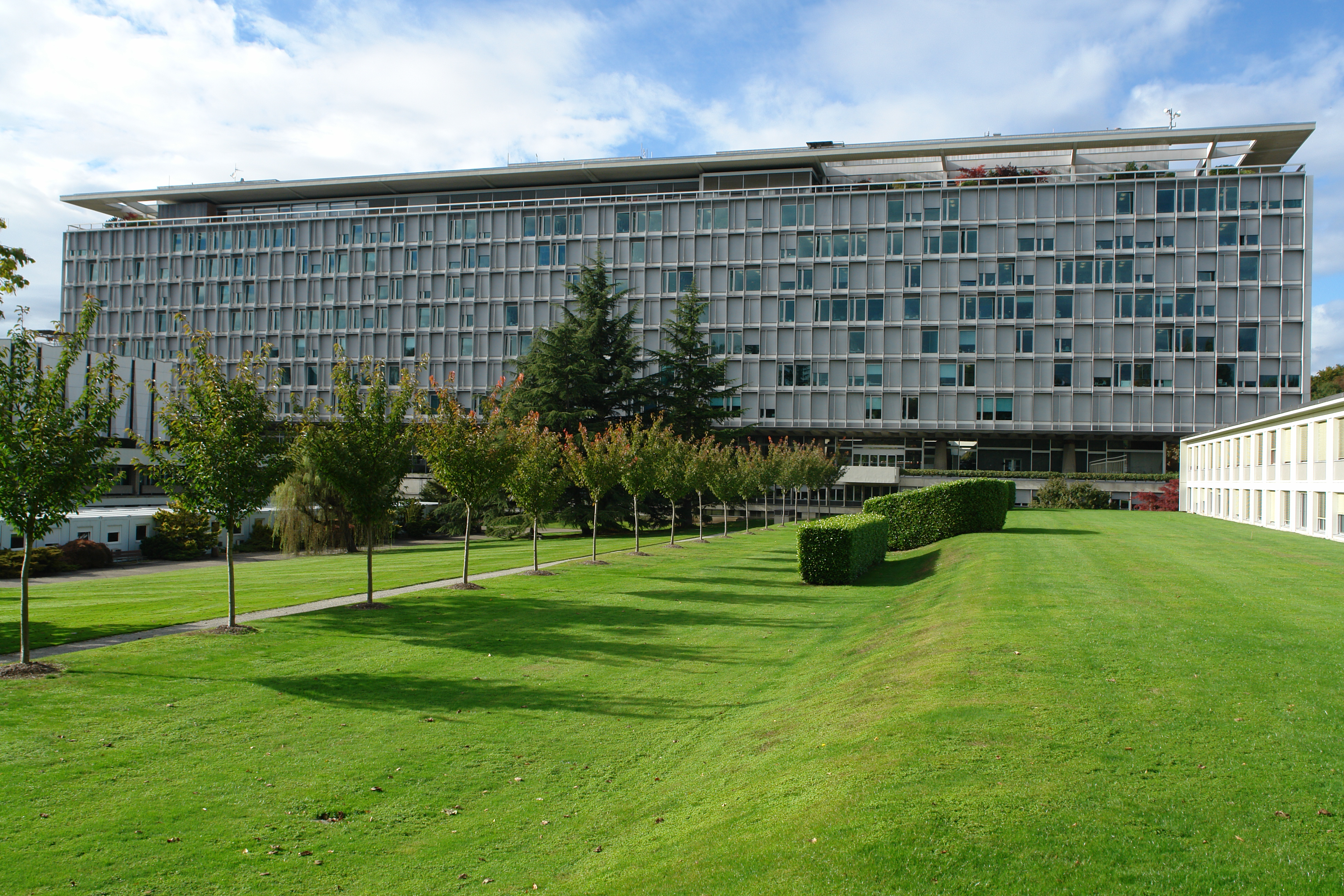
The World Health Organization in Geneva, Switzerland

Global health is the health of populations in a worldwide context; it has been defined as "the area of study, research, and practice that places a priority on improving health and achieving equity in health for all people worldwide". Problems that transcend national borders or have a global political and economic impact are often emphasized. Thus, global health is about worldwide health improvement (including mental health), reduction of disparities, and protection against global threats that disregard national borders, including the most common causes of human death and years of life lost from a global perspective.

Global health is not to be confused with international health, which is defined as the branch of public health focusing on developing nations and foreign aid efforts by industrialized countries.

One way that global health can be measured is through the prevalence of various global diseases in the world and their threat to decrease life expectancy in the present day. Estimates suggest that in a pre-modern, poor world, life expectancy was around 30 years in all regions of the world (mainly due to high infant mortality). Another holistic perspective called One Health can be used to address global health challenges and to improve global health security.

The predominant agency associated with global health (and international health) is the World Health Organization (WHO). Other important agencies impacting global health include UNICEF and World Food Programme (WFP). The United Nations system has also played a part in cross-sectoral actions to address global health and its underlying socioeconomic determinants with the declaration of the Millennium Development Goals and the more recent Sustainable Development Goals. The field of global health law studies international lawmaking bodies, such as the WHO, and their effect on global health.

== Definition ==
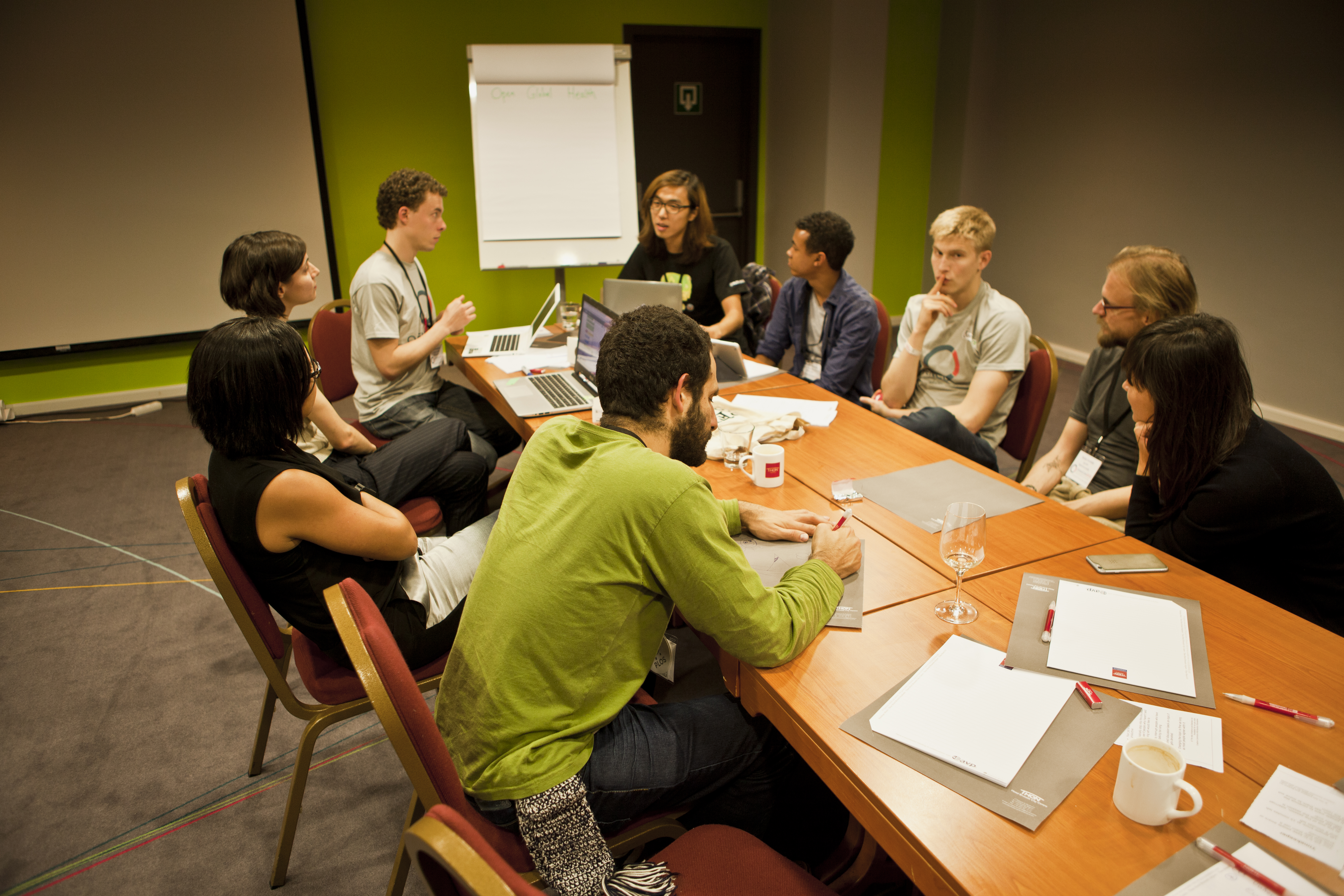
Open Global Health at OpenCon 2015

Global health employs several perspectives that focus on the determinants and distribution of health in international contexts.

- Medicine describes the pathology of diseases and promotes prevention, diagnosis, and treatment.
- Public health emphasizes the health of populations.
- Epidemiology helps identify risk factors and causes of health problems.
- Demography provides data for policy decisions.
- Economics emphasizes the cost-effectiveness and cost-benefit approaches for the optimal allocation of health resources.
- Other social sciences such as sociology, development studies, psychology, anthropology, cultural studies, and law can help understand the determinants of health in societies.

Both individuals and organizations working in the domain of global health often face many questions regarding ethical and human rights. Critical examination of the various causes and justifications of health inequities is necessary for the success of proposed solutions. Such issues are discussed at the bi-annual Global Summits of National Ethics/Bioethics Councils.

== History ==
Life expectancy by world region, from 1770 to 2018

Important steps were taken towards global co-operation in health with the formation of the United Nations (UN) and the World Bank Group in 1945, after World War II. In 1948, the member states of the newly formed United Nations gathered to create the World Health Organization. A cholera epidemic that took 20,000 lives in Egypt in 1947 and 1948 helped spur the international community to action. The WHO published its Model List of Essential Medicines, and the 1978 Alma Ata declaration underlined the importance of primary health care.

At a United Nations Summit in 2000, member nations declared eight Millennium Development Goals (MDGs), which reflected the major challenges facing human development globally, to be achieved by 2015. The declaration was matched by unprecedented global investment by donor and recipient countries. According to the UN, these MDGs provided an important framework for development and significant progress has been made in a number of areas. However, progress has been uneven and some of the MDGs were not fully realized including maternal, newborn and child health and reproductive health. Building on the MDGs, a new Sustainable Development Agenda with 17 Sustainable Development Goals (SDGs) has been established for the years 2016–2030. The first goal being an ambitious and historic pledge to end poverty. On 25 September 2015, the 193 countries of the UN General Assembly adopted the 2030 Development Agenda titled Transforming our world: the 2030 Agenda for Sustainable Development.

Several major initiatives began in the 2000s, including the vaccine alliance GAVI in 2000, The Global Fund to Fight AIDS, Tuberculosis and Malaria in 2002, U.S. President's Emergency Plan for AIDS Relief in 2003, and the U.S. President's Malaria Initiative in 2005. In this decade and as part of the Monterrey Consensus (which did not pursue goals as aggressively as many activists had urged), an increasing emphasis was put on measuring improvement in health outcomes, rather than merely the amount of money spent.

In 2015 a book titled To Save Humanity was published, with nearly 100 essays regarding today's most pressing global health issues. The essays were authored by global figures in politics, science, and advocacy ranging from Bill Clinton to Peter Piot, and addressed a wide range of issues including vaccinations, antimicrobial resistance, health coverage, tobacco use, research methodology, climate change, equity, access to medicine, and media coverage of health research.

Global health as a discipline is frequently regarded to be of imperial origin, and there have been calls for its decolonisation. The global health ecosystem has also been criticised as having a feudal structure, acting for a small group of institutions and individuals based in high-income countries which acts similar to an imperial "Crown".

== Measures ==
Measures of global health include disability-adjusted life year (DALY), quality-adjusted life years (QALYs), and mortality rate.

=== Disability-adjusted life years ===
Disability-adjusted life years per 100,000 people in 2021: no data less than 23,500 23,500-31,000 31,000-38,500 38,500-46,000 46,000-53,500 53,500-61,000 61,000-68,500 68,500-76,000 more than 76,000

The DALY is a summary measure that combines the impact of illness, disability, and mortality by measuring the time lived with disability and the time lost due to premature mortality. One DALY can be thought of as one lost year of "healthy" life. The DALY for a disease is the sum of the years of life lost due to premature mortality and the years lost due to disability for incident cases of the health condition.

=== Quality-adjusted life years ===
QALYs combine expected survival with expected quality of life into a single number: if an additional year of healthy life is worth a value of one (year), then a year of less healthy life is worth less than one (year). QALY calculations are based on measurements of the value that individuals place on expected years of survival. Measurements can be made in several ways: by techniques that replicate gambles about preferences for alternative states of health, with surveys or analyses that infer willingness to pay for alternative states of health, or through instruments that are based on trading off some or all likely survival time that a medical intervention might provide in order to gain less survival time of higher quality.

=== Infant and child mortality ===
Infant mortality and child mortality for children under age 5 are more specific than DALYs or QALYs in representing the health in the poorest sections of a population, and are thus especially useful when focusing on health equity. added section

=== Morbidity ===
Morbidity measures include incidence rate, prevalence, and cumulative incidence, with incidence rate referring to the risk of developing a new health condition within a specified period of time. Although sometimes loosely expressed simply as the number of new cases during a time period, morbidity is better expressed as a proportion or a rate.

== Health topics ==
=== Infectious diseases ===
==== Respiratory tract infections ====
Infections of the respiratory tract and middle ear are major causes of morbidity and mortality worldwide. Some respiratory infections of global significance include tuberculosis, measles, influenza, coronaviruses and pneumonias caused by Mycobacterium tuberculosis, Morbillivirus, Haemophilus influenzae and Pneumococci respectively. The spread of respiratory infections is exacerbated by crowded conditions, and poverty is associated with more than a 20-fold increase in the relative burden of lung infections.

==== Diarrheal illnesses ====
Diarrhea is the second most common cause of child mortality worldwide, responsible for 17% of deaths of children under age 5. Poor sanitation can increase transmission of bacteria and viruses through water, food, utensils, hands, and flies. Dehydration due to diarrhea can be effectively treated through oral rehydration therapy with dramatic reductions in mortality. Important nutritional measures include the promotion of breastfeeding and zinc supplementation. While hygienic measures alone may be insufficient for the prevention of rotavirus diarrhea, it can be prevented by a safe and potentially cost-effective vaccine.

==== HIV/AIDS ====
The HIV/AIDS epidemic has highlighted the global nature of human health and welfare and globalization has given rise to a trend toward finding common solutions to global health challenges. Numerous international funds have been set up in recent times to address global health challenges such as HIV. Since the beginning of the epidemic, more than 70 million people have been infected with the HIV virus and about 35 million people have died of HIV. Globally, 36.9 million [31.1–43.9 million] people were living with HIV at the end of 2017. An estimated 0.8% [0.6–0.9%] of adults aged 15–49 years worldwide are living with HIV, although the burden of the epidemic continues to vary considerably between countries and regions. The WHO African region remains most severely affected, with nearly 1 in every 25 adults (4.1%) living with HIV and accounting for nearly two-thirds of the people living with HIV worldwide. Human immunodeficiency virus (HIV) is transmitted through unprotected sex, unclean needles, blood transfusions, and from mother to child during birth or lactation. Globally, HIV is primarily spread through sexual intercourse. The risk-per-exposure with vaginal sex in low-income countries from female to male is 0.38% and male to female is 0.3%. The infection damages the immune system, leading to acquired immunodeficiency syndrome (AIDS) and eventually, death. Antiretroviral drugs prolong life and delay the onset of AIDS by minimizing the amount of HIV in the body.

==== Malaria ====
Malaria is a mosquito-borne infectious disease caused by the parasites of the genus Plasmodium. Symptoms may include fever, headaches, chills, muscle aches and nausea. Each year, there are approximately 500 million cases of malaria worldwide, most commonly among children and pregnant women in developing countries. The WHO African Region carries a disproportionately high share of the global malaria burden. In 2016, the region was home to 90% of malaria cases and 91% of malaria deaths. The use of insecticide-treated bed nets is a cost-effective way to reduce deaths from malaria, as is prompt artemisinin-based combination therapy, supported by intermittent preventive therapy in pregnancy. International travelers to endemic zones are advised chemoprophylaxis with antimalarial drugs like Atovaquone-proguanil, doxycycline, or mefloquine. Global consumption and international trade in deforestation-associated commodities could also indirectly influence malaria risk. Many primary commodities cause deforestation and deforestation can increase malaria transmission. Consumption of such commodities in developed nations could increase malaria risk in developing nations.

==== Bacterial pathogens ====
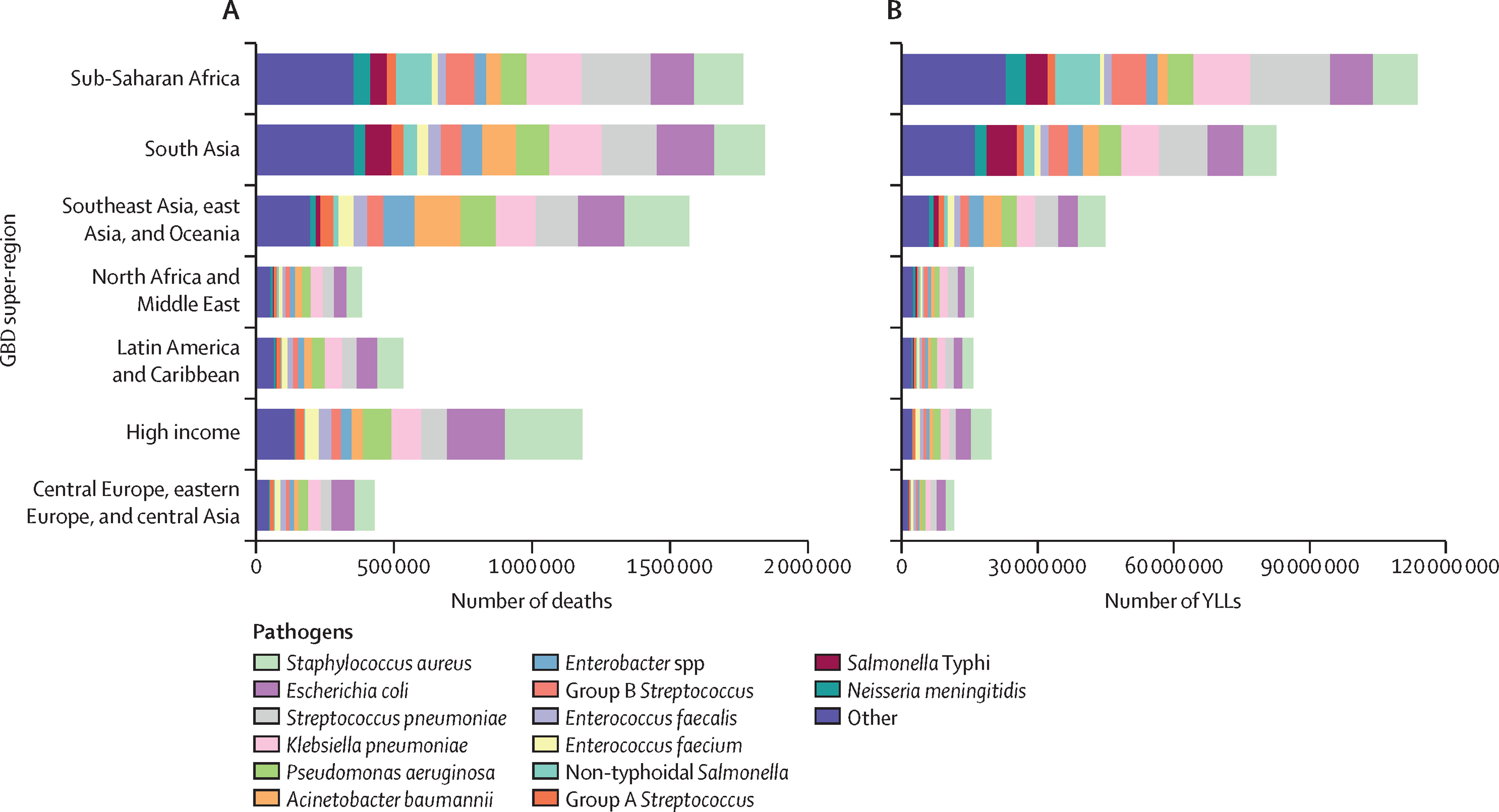
Global number of deaths (A) and YLLs (B), by pathogen and GBD super-region, 2019

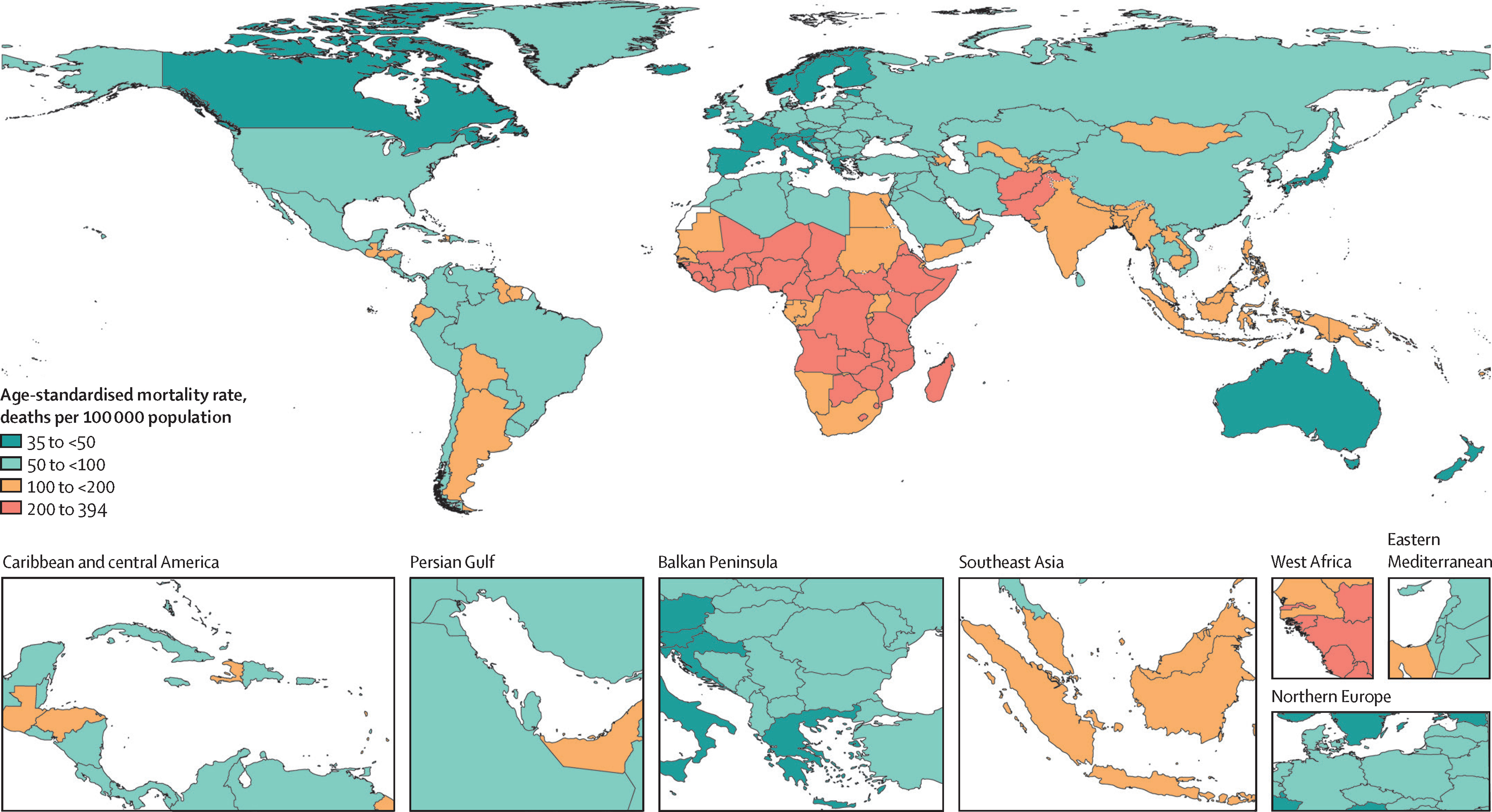
Overall age-standardised mortality rate per 100 000 population for 33 pathogens investigated, 2019

A GBD study reported global estimates of death rates from (33) bacterial pathogens, finding such infections are contributing to one in 8 deaths (or ~7.7 million deaths), which could make it the second largest cause of death globally in 2019.

==== Neglected tropical diseases ====
More than one billion people were treated for at least one neglected tropical disease in 2015. For instance, neglected tropical diseases are a diverse group of infectious diseases that are endemic in tropical and subtropical regions of 149 countries, primarily effecting low and middle income populations in Africa, Asia, and Latin America. They are variously caused by bacteria (trachoma, leprosy), viruses (dengue, rabies), protozoa (human African trypanosomiasis, chagas), and helminths (schistosomiasis, onchocerciasis, Soil transmitted helminths). The Global Burden of Disease Study concluded that neglected tropical diseases comprehensively contributed to approximately 26.06 million disability-adjusted life years in 2010, as well as significant deleterious economic effects. In 2011, the World Health Organization launched a 2020 Roadmap for neglected tropical diseases, aiming for the control or elimination of 10 common diseases. The 2012 London Declaration builds on this initiative, and called on endemic countries and the international community to improve access to clean water and basic sanitation, improved living conditions, vector control, and health education, to reach the 2020 goals. In 2017, a WHO report cited "unprecedented progress" against neglected tropical diseases since 2007, especially due to mass drug administration of drugs donated by pharmaceutical companies.

==== Pandemic prevention and preparedness ====
Pandemics have an impact on global health.

Pandemic prevention is the organization and management of preventive measures against pandemics. Those include measures to reduce causes of new infectious diseases and measures to prevent outbreaks and epidemics from becoming pandemics. It is not to be mistaken for pandemic preparedness or mitigation (e.g. against COVID-19) which largely seek to mitigate the magnitude of negative effects of pandemics, although the topics may overlap with pandemic prevention in some respects.

Pandemics typically arise naturally from interactions between humans and animals, but emerging technologies are also expected to facilitate the synthesis and enhancement of dangerous pathogens, making bioterrorism and laboratory accidents emerging threats.

Pandemic prevention measures include early detection systems, international coordination with information sharing, laboratory biosafety protocols, oversight of gain-of-function research, restricting access to dual-use biotechnology, monitoring spillover risks in wild animal populations, regulating wildlife trade and wet markets, reducing intensive animal farming, protecting ecosystems, and strengthening public health care systems.

In May 2025, all Member States of the World Health Organization (WHO) formally adopted the world's first Pandemic Agreement.

Prevention of future pandemics requires steps to identify future causes of pandemics and to take preventive measures before the disease moves uncontrollably into the human population.

For example, influenza is a rapidly evolving disease which has caused pandemics in the past and has the potential to cause future pandemics. WHO collates the findings of 144 national influenza centres worldwide which monitor emerging flu viruses. Virus variants which are assessed as likely to represent a significant risk are identified and can then be incorporated into the next seasonal influenza vaccine program.

In a press conference on 28 December 2020, Mike Ryan, head of the WHO Emergencies Program, and other officials said the current COVID-19 pandemic was "not necessarily the big one" and "the next pandemic may be more severe." They called for preparation. WHO and the UN have warned the world must tackle the cause of pandemics and not just the health and economic symptoms.

=== Health research and development ===
The global health approach could foster international collaboration in medical research and development and share of its results such as vaccines, optimizing overall global health for citizens. The U.S. Agency for International Development's new Global Health Research and Development Strategy 2023–2028 includes plans to coordinate with such stakeholders in support of innovative global health product development and work with other agencies like the CDC and National Institutes of Health. Another approach to health would be the innovation of vaccines. The Washington Post reported the US government's new five billion dollar budget on vaccines to prevent Covid variants because the Vaccines' access and public-private partnerships are important. Often the relevance of mechanisms to stimulate research and development is limited by national scopes and "by the transnational nature of the problem which asks for an international approach". Financing models, creation of evidence-based recommendations, and logistics may be part of that.

A seminal article by Thomas Pogge, published in Metaphilosophy in 2005, addresses the global health crisis, in which one-third of all human deaths are due to poverty-related causes, the majority of which are preventable. Pogge critiques the existing patent regime, particularly the TRIPS agreement, for its role in limiting access to essential medicines and violating human rights. Pogge proposes a reform of the global health system with the objective of making medical knowledge freely available as a global public good. The reform includes providing the results of successful drug development as public goods, rewarding inventor firms based on the impact of their inventions on the global disease burden, and ensuring a fair and feasible allocation of costs. The article argues that this reform would align the interests of pharmaceutical companies with those of patients and generic drug producers, incentivize research into neglected diseases, and be cost-effective. It also discusses the moral urgency of addressing the global health crisis and the responsibility of high-income countries to support reforms that benefit the global poor. It concludes by emphasizing the feasibility and political realism of the proposed reform, which aims to extend the benefits of medical advancements to the poor and realize human rights more fully.

=== Maternal health ===
Complications of pregnancy and childbirth are the leading causes of death among women of reproductive age. In many developing countries, a woman dies from complications from childbirth approximately every minute. According to the World Health Organization's 2005 World Health Report, poor maternal conditions are the fourth leading cause of death for women worldwide, after HIV/AIDS, malaria, and tuberculosis. Most maternal deaths and injuries can be prevented, and such deaths have been largely eradicated in the developed world. Targets for improving maternal health include increasing and assisting the number of deliveries accompanied by skilled birth attendants. 68 low-income countries tracked by the WHO- and UNICEF-led collaboration Countdown to 2015 are estimated to hold for 97% of worldwide maternal and child deaths.

=== Nutrition ===
In 2010, about 104 million children were underweight, and undernutrition contributes to about one third of child deaths around the world. (Undernutrition is not to be confused with malnutrition, which refers to poor proportion of food intake and can thus refer to obesity.) Undernutrition impairs the immune system, increasing the frequency, severity, and duration of infections (including measles, pneumonia, and diarrhea). Infection can further contribute to malnutrition.

Deficiencies of micronutrients, such as vitamin A, iron, iodine, and zinc, are common worldwide and can compromise intellectual potential, growth, development, and adult productivity. Interventions to prevent malnutrition include micronutrient supplementation, fortification of basic grocery foods, dietary diversification, hygienic measures to reduce spread of infections, and the promotion of breastfeeding.

=== Non-communicable diseases ===
Approximately 80% of deaths linked to non-communicable diseases occur in developing countries. For instance, urbanization and aging have led to increasing poor health conditions related to non-communicable diseases in India. Similarly, China's rapid urbanization and modernization have been associated with increased sedentary lifestyles, contributing to the rise in NCDs in the region. The fastest-growing causes of disease burden over the last 26 years were diabetes (rate increased by 80%) and ischemic heart disease (up 34%). More than 60% of deaths, about 6.1 million, in 2016 were due to NCDs, up from about 38% in 1990. Increases in refugee urbanization, has led to a growing number of people diagnosed with chronic non-communicable diseases.

In September 2011, the United Nations is hosting its first General Assembly Special Summit on the issue of non-communicable diseases. Noting that non-communicable diseases are the cause of some 35 million deaths each year, the international community is being increasingly called to take measures for the prevention and control of chronic diseases and mitigate their impacts on the world population, especially on women, who are usually the primary caregivers.

For example, the rate of type 2 diabetes, associated with obesity, has been on the rise in countries previously troubled by hunger. In low-income countries, the number of individuals with diabetes is expected to increase from 84 million to 228 million by 2030. Obesity, a preventable condition, is associated with numerous chronic diseases, including cardiovascular conditions, stroke, certain cancers, and respiratory disease. About 16% of the global burden of disease, measured as DALYs, has been accounted for by obesity.

Considering that 360 million people across the world live with disabling hearing loss, including 32 million children and nearly 180 million older adults, and that chronic ear diseases, such as chronic suppurative otitis media, can lead to hearing loss and may cause life-threatening complications, the seventieth World Health Assembly on May 31, 2017 signed the resolution WHA70.13 (Agenda item 15.8) urging member states to integrate strategies for ear and hearing care within the framework of their primary health care systems, under the umbrella of universal health coverage. A World Report on Hearing (WRH) was published in response to the resolution (WHA70.13), to provide guidance for Member States to integrate ear and hearing care into their national health plans.

=== Lifestyle diseases ===
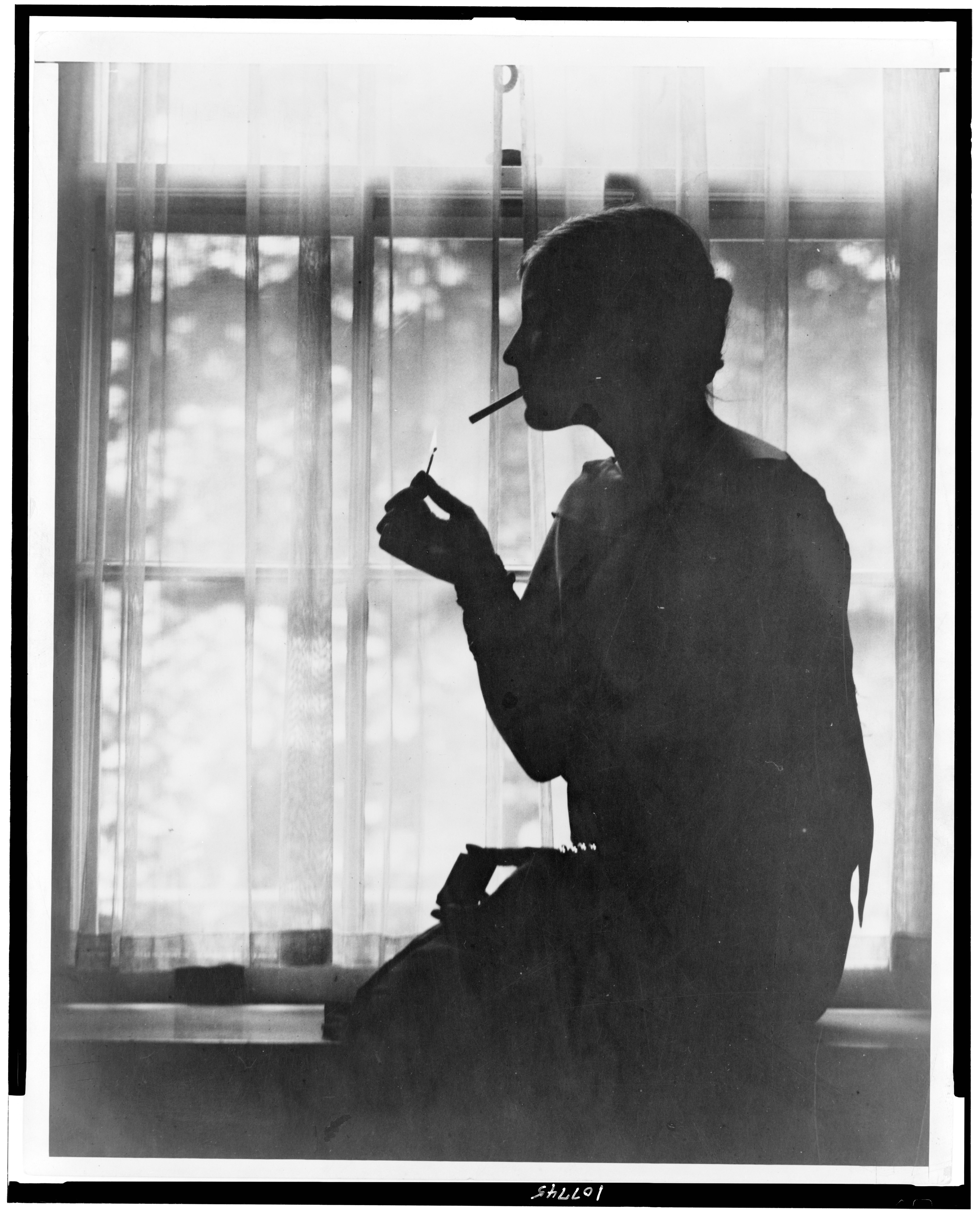
Tobacco smoking can lead to lung cancer, considered a lifestyle disease.

Lifestyle diseases can be defined as the diseases linked to the manner in which a person lives their life. These diseases are non-communicable, and can be caused by lack of physical activity, unhealthy eating, alcohol, substance use disorders and smoking tobacco, which can lead to heart disease, stroke, obesity, type II diabetes and lung cancer. The diseases that appear to increase in frequency as countries become more industrialized and people live longer include Alzheimer's disease, arthritis, atherosclerosis, asthma, cancer, chronic liver disease or cirrhosis, chronic obstructive pulmonary disease, colitis, irritable bowel syndrome, type 2 diabetes, heart disease, hypertension, metabolic syndrome, chronic kidney failure, osteoporosis, PCOD, stroke, depression, obesity and vascular dementia.

Concerns were raised in 2011 that lifestyle diseases could soon have an impact on the workforce and the cost of health care. Treating these non-communicable diseases can be expensive. It can be critical for the patient's health to receive primary prevention and identify early symptoms of these non-communicable diseases. These lifestyle diseases are expected to increase throughout the years if people do not improve their lifestyle choices.

Some commenters maintain a distinction between diseases of longevity and diseases of civilization or diseases of affluence. Certain diseases, such as diabetes, dental caries and asthma, appear at greater rates in young populations living in the "western" way; their increased incidence is not related to age, so the terms cannot accurately be used interchangeably for all diseases.

Commercial determinants of health refers to private sector activities that affect people's health positively or negatively such as advertisements for unhealthy food.

=== Health-related largest causes of death ===
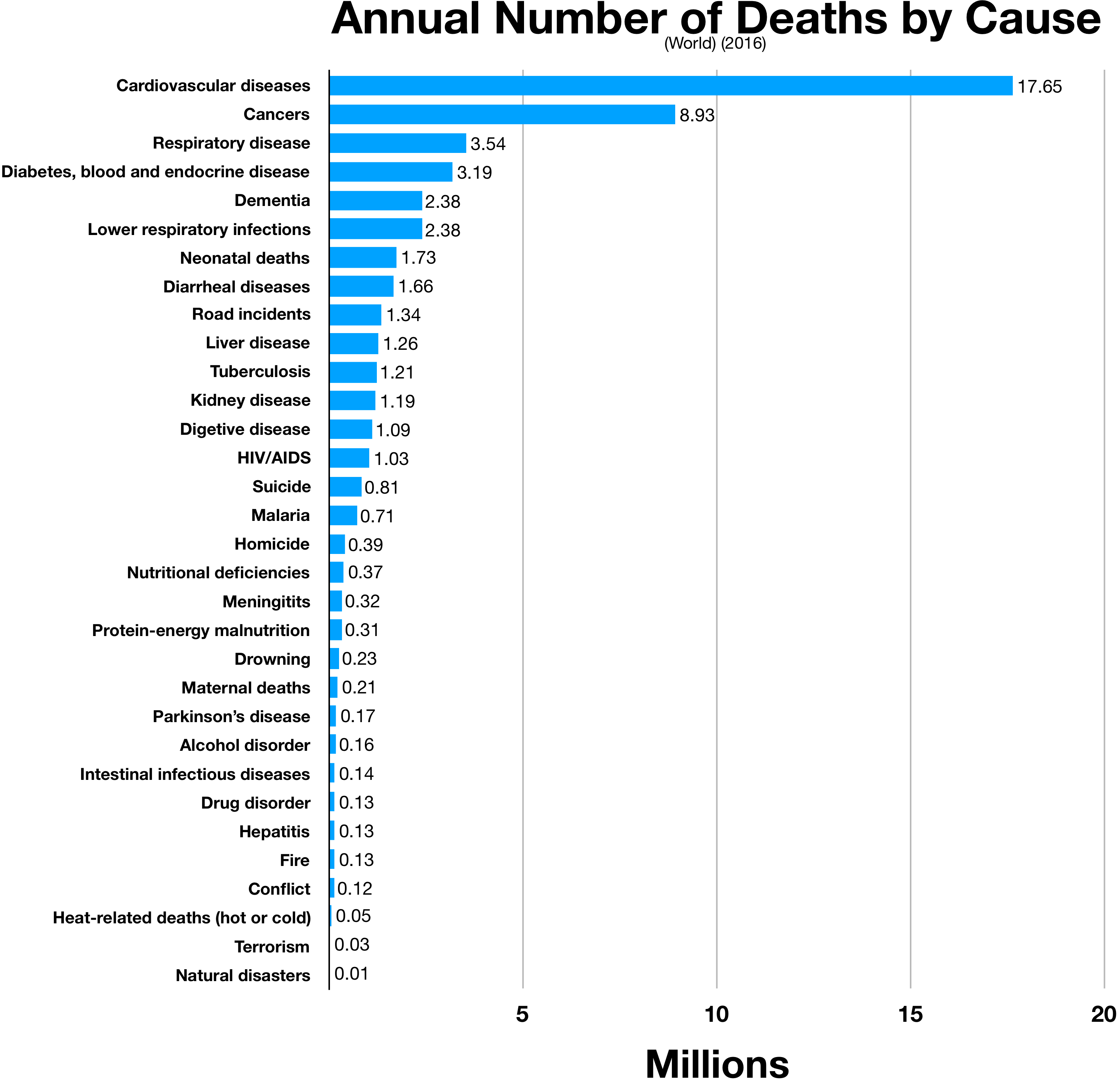
Leading cause of death (2016) (world)

The following is a list of the causes of human deaths worldwide for different years arranged by their associated mortality rates. Some causes listed include deaths also included in more specific subordinate causes, and some causes are omitted, so the percentages may only sum approximately to 100%. The causes listed are relatively immediate medical causes, but the ultimate cause of death might be described differently. For example, tobacco smoking often causes lung disease or cancer, and alcohol use disorder can cause liver failure or a motor vehicle accident. For statistics on preventable ultimate causes, see preventable causes of death.

In 2002, there were about 57 million deaths. In 2005, according to the World Health Organization (WHO) using the International Classification of Diseases (ICD), about 58 million people died. In 2010, according to the Institute for Health Metrics and Evaluation, 52.8 million people died. In 2016, the WHO recorded 56.7 million deaths with the leading cause of death as cardiovascular disease causing more than 17 million deaths (about 31% of the total) as shown in the chart to the side. In 2021, there were approx. 68 million deaths worldwide, as per WHO report.

Besides frequency, other measures to compare, consider, and monitor trends of causes of deaths include disability-adjusted life year (DALY) and years of potential life lost (YPLL).

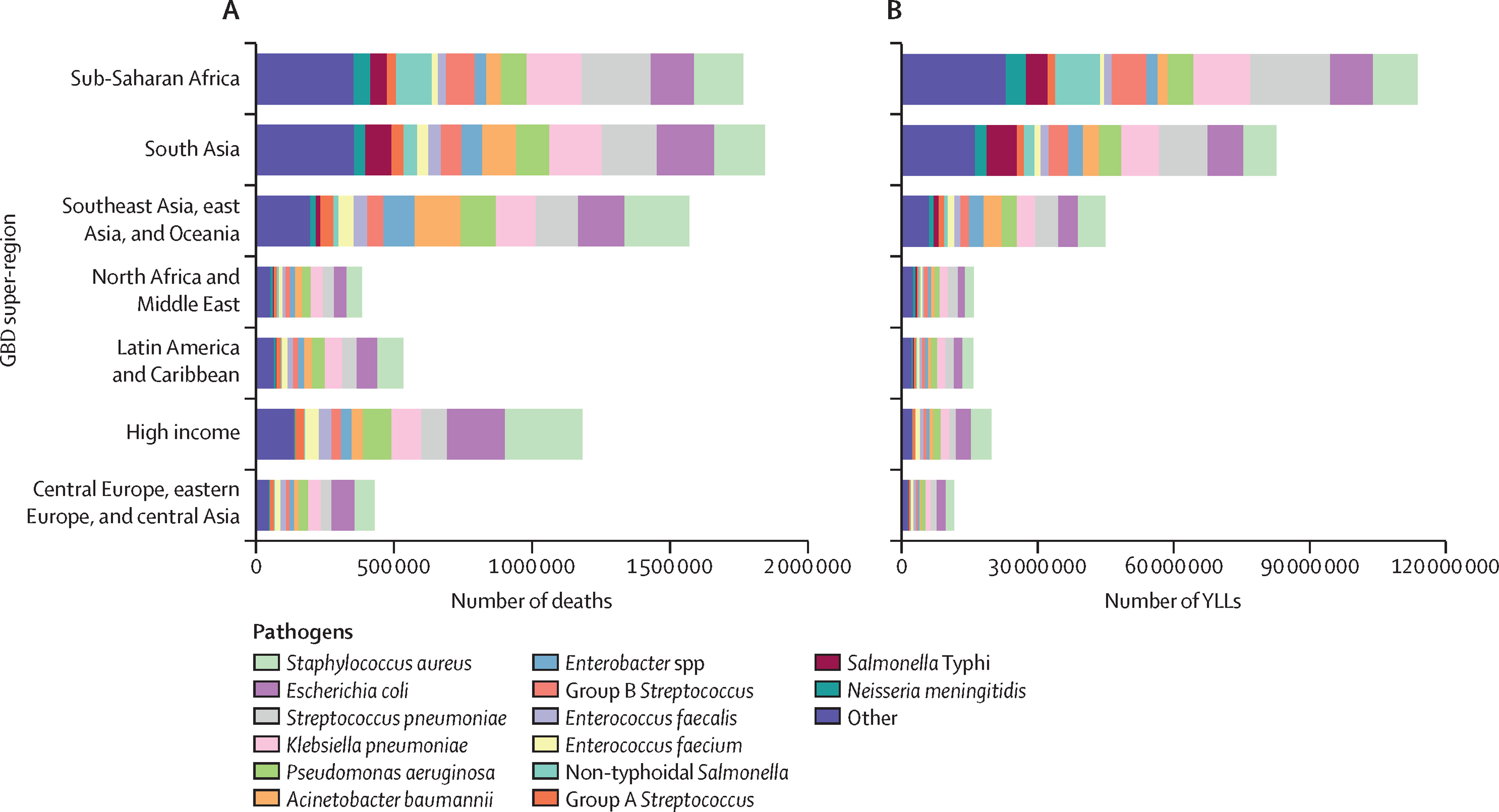
Global number of deaths (A) and YLLs (B), by bacterial pathogen (of 33) and GBD super-region, 2019

Top causes of death, according to the World Health Organization report for the calendar year 2001:

Causes of death in developing countries	Number of deaths	Causes of death in developed countries	Number of deaths
HIV-AIDS	2,678,000	Ischaemic heart disease	3,512,000
Lower respiratory infections	2,643,000	Cerebrovascular disease	3,346,000
Ischaemic heart disease	2,484,000	Chronic obstructive pulmonary disease	1,829,000
Diarrhea	1,793,000	Lower respiratory infections	1,180,000
Cerebrovascular disease	1,381,000	Lung cancer	938,000
Childhood diseases	1,217,000	Traffic accident	669,000
Malaria	1,103,000	Stomach cancer	657,000
Tuberculosis	1,021,000	Hypertensive heart disease	635,000
Chronic obstructive pulmonary disease	748,000	Tuberculosis	571,000
Measles	674,000	Suicide	499,000

=== Violence against women ===
Violence against women has been defined as: "physical, sexual and psychological violence occurring in the family and in the general community, including battering, sexual abuse, dowry-related violence, rape, female genital mutilation and other traditional practices harmful to women, non-spousal violence and violence related to exploitation, sexual harassment and intimidation at work, in educational institutions and elsewhere, trafficking in women, forced prostitution and violence perpetrated or condoned by the state." In addition to causing injury, violence may increase "women's long-term risk of a number of other health problems, including chronic pain, physical disability, drug and alcohol abuse, and depression". The WHO Report on global and regional estimates on violence against women found that partner abuse causes women to have 16% more chances of suffering miscarriages, 41% more occurrences of pre-term birth babies and twice the likeliness of having abortions and acquiring HIV or other STDs

Although statistics can be difficult to obtain as many cases go unreported, it is estimated that one in every five women faces some form of violence during her lifetime, in some cases leading to serious injury or even death. Risk factors for being an offender include low education, past exposure to child maltreatment or witnessing violence between parents, harmful use of alcohol, attitudes accepting of violence, and gender inequality. Equality of women has been addressed in the Millennium Development Goals. Now, gender equality is Sustainable Development Goal 5. Preventing the violence against women needs to form an essential part of the public health reforms in the form of advocation and evidence gathering. Primary prevention in the form of raising women economic empowerment facilities, microfinance and skills training social projects related to gender equality should be conducted.

Activities promoting relationship and communication skills among couples, reducing alcohol access and altering societal ideologies should be organized. Childhood interventions, community and school-based education, raising media-oriented awareness and other approaches should be carried out to challenge social norms and stereotypical thought processes to promote behavioral change among men and raise gender equality. Trained health care providers would play a vital role in secondary and tertiary prevention of abuse by performing early identification of women suffering from violence and contributing to the addressing of their health and psychological needs. They could be highly important in prevention of the recurrence of violence and the mitigation of its effects on the health of the abused women and their children. The Member States of the World Health Assembly endorsed a plan in 2016 for reinforcing the health system's role in addressing the global phenomenon of violence against women and girls and working towards their health and protection.

=== Global surgery ===
Halfdan T. Mahler, the 3rd Director-General of the World Health Organization (WHO), first brought attention to the disparities in surgery and surgical care when he stated, "the vast majority of the world's population has no access whatsoever to skilled surgical care and little is being done to find a solution".

While significant progresses have been made in fields within global health such as infectious diseases, maternal and child health, and even other non-communicable diseases over the past several decades, the provision of surgery and surgical care in resource-limited settings have largely remained unmet with about 5 billion people lacking access to safe and affordable surgical and anesthesia care. This is especially true in the poorest countries, which account for over one-third of the population but only 3.5% of all surgeries that occur worldwide. In fact, it has been estimated that up to 30% of the total global burden of disease (GBD) could be attributable to surgical conditions, which include a mix of injuries, malignancies, congenital anomalies, and complications of pregnancy. As a result, global surgery has become an emerging field within global health as "the multidisciplinary enterprise of providing improved and equitable surgical care to the world's population, with its core belief as the issues of need, access and quality" and has often been described as the "neglected stepchild of global health", a term coined by Dr. Paul Farmer to highlight the urgent need for further work in this area. Furthermore, Jim Young Kim, the former President of the World Bank, proclaimed in 2014 that "surgery is an indivisible, indispensable part of health care and of progress towards universal health coverage."

In 2015, the Lancet Commission on Global Surgery (LCoGS) published the landmark report titled "Global Surgery 2030: evidence and solutions for achieving health, welfare, and economic development", describing the large, pre-existing burden of surgical diseases in low- and middle-income countries (LMICs) and future directions for increasing universal access to safe surgery by the year 2030. The Commission highlighted that 143 million additional procedures were needed every year to prevent further morbidity and mortality from treatable surgical conditions as well as a $12.3 trillion loss in economic productivity by the year 2030. It emphasized the need to significantly improve the capacity for Bellwether procedures — laparotomy, caesarean section, open fracture care — which are considered a minimum level of care that first-level hospitals should be able to provide in order to capture the most basic emergency surgical care. In order to address these challenges and track progress, the Commission defined the following core indicators for assessing access to safe and affordable surgical d anesthesia care:

Core Indicators	Definition	Target
Access to timely essential surgery	The proportion of the population that can access, within 2 hours, a facility that can do cesarean delivery, laparotomy, and treatment of open fracture (the Bellwether Procedures)	A minimum of 80% coverage of essential surgical and anesthesia services per country by 2030
Specialist surgical workforce density	The number of specialist surgical, anaesthetic, and obstetric physicians who are working, per 100,000 population	100% of countries with at least 20 surgical, anaesthetic, and obstetric physicians per 100,000 population by 2030
Surgical volume	The number of procedures done in an operating theatre, per 100,000 population per year	80% of countries by 2020 and 100% of countries by 2030 tracking surgical volume; a minimum of 5000 procedures per 100,000 population by 2030
Perioperative mortality	All-cause death rate before discharge in patients who have undergone a procedure in an operating theatre, divided by the total number of procedures, presented as a percentage	80% of countries by 2020 and 100% of countries by 2030 tracking perioperative mortality; in 2020, assess global data and set national targets for 2030
Protection against impoverishing expenditure	The proportion of households protected against impoverishment from direct out-of-pocket payments for surgical and anesthesia care	100% protection against impoverishment from out-of-pocket payments for surgical and anaesthesia care by 2030
Protection against catastrophic expenditure	The proportion of households protected against catastrophic expenditure from direct out-of-pocket payments for surgical and anesthesia care	100% protection against catastrophic expenditure from out-of-pocket payments for surgical and anaesthesia care by 2030

Meeting these goals by the year 2030 would require increases in anesthetists, obstetricians, surgeons, nurses, and facilities with operating rooms as well as pre- and post-surgical care capacities.

Data from WHO and the World Bank indicate that scaling up infrastructure to enable access to surgical care in regions where it is currently limited or is non-existent is a low-cost measure relative to the significant morbidity and mortality caused by lack of surgical treatment. In fact, a systematic review found that the cost-effectiveness ratio — dollars spent per DALYs averted — for surgical interventions is on par or exceeds those of major public health interventions such as oral rehydration therapy, breastfeeding promotion, and even HIV/AIDS antiretroviral therapy. This finding challenged the common misconception that surgical care is financially prohibitive endeavor not worth pursuing in LMICs.

In terms of the financial impact on the patients, the lack of adequate surgical and anesthesia care has resulted in 33 million individuals every year facing catastrophic health expenditure — the out-of-pocket healthcare cost exceeding 40% of a given household's income.

In alignment with the LCoGS call for action, the World Health Assembly adopted the resolution WHA68.15 in 2015 that stated, "Strengthening emergency and essential surgical care and anesthesia as a component of universal health coverage." This not only mandated the WHO to prioritize strengthening the surgical and anesthesia care globally, but also led to governments of the member states recognizing the urgent need for increasing capacity in surgery and anesthesia. Additionally, the third edition of Disease Control Priorities (DCP3), published in 2015 by the World Bank, declared surgery as essential and featured an entire volume dedicated to building surgical capacity.

A key policy framework that arose from this renewed global commitment towards surgical care worldwide is the National Surgical Obstetric and Anesthesia Plan (NSOAP). NSOAP focuses on policy-to-action capacity building for surgical care with tangible steps as follows: (1) analysis of baseline indicators, (2) partnership with local champions, (3) broad stakeholder engagement, (4) consensus building and synthesis of ideas, (5) language refinement, (6) costing, (7) dissemination, and (8) implementation. This approach has been widely adopted and has served as guiding principles between international collaborators and local institutions and governments. Successful implementations have allowed for sustainability in terms of longterm monitoring, quality improvement, and continued political and financial support.

==== The NIHR Global Health Research Unit on Global Surgery ====
Seven surgical research Hubs in Benin, Ghana, India, Mexico, Nigeria, Rwanda and South Africa with an extensive network of urban and rural 'Spoke' hospitals have joined to create the NIHR. The NIHR Global Health Research Unit on Global Surgery is led by the University of Birmingham which provides overall oversight in relation to the Unit strategy, infrastructure and delivery, research and finance.

The network prioritized surgical topics that needed research and has performed multiple surgical studies. The network resulted in many research groups including GlobalSurg I, II, III and COVIDSurg and many other trials with worldwide collaborations as project FALCON, CHEETAH, GECKO, HIPPO, MAGPIES, WOLVERINE and more.

The research was published in over 40 articles in high impact journals in topics like surgical site infections, COVID-19 and mortality.

==== Other global surgery collaborations ====
More trials have emerged to assess surgical outcomes around the World using big data from thousands of centers. Other notable trials include:

- Global PaedSurg; The study was published in The Lancet examined the risk of mortality for nearly 4000 babies born with birth defects in 264 hospitals around the world. The study found babies born with birth defects involving the intestinal tract have a two in five chance of dying in a low-income country compared to one in five in a middle-income country and one in twenty in a high-income country.
- APORG: The African Perioperative Research Group (APORG) was launched in South Africa
- ASOS and ASOS-2: The studies showed that death after surgery is a major public health problem in Africa. Surgical patients in Africa are twice as likely to die in hospital following surgery when compared to the global average.
- ASOS PaedSurg: African Pediatric postoperative outcomes are poor, with up to 4x morbidity and 11x mortality rates than high income countries.
- ACCCOS: COVID-19 Mortality was higher in Africa than reported from studies done in other parts of the World.
- ACIOS (African Critical Illness Outcomes Study): 1/8 patients in African hospitals are critically ill with 20% 7 day mortality rate. About 56% do not receive even the basic critical care needs.
- Global Health Research Group on Children's Non-Communicable Diseases Collaborative
- SnapSBO (Small Bowel Obstruction) study Group

Many scholars from around the world have participated in overlapping trials whether as Principal Investigators, Dissemination Committee or Regional leaders to promote the research and oversee data collection. Notable collaborators from these networks include The list included key figures from around the World as Prof Bruce Biccard (South Africa), Prof Adesoji Ademuyiwa (Nigeria), Prof Kokila Lakhoo (Oxford, UK), Dr Naomi Wright (Oxford, UK), Dr Emrah Aydin (Turkey), Prof Mahmoud Elfiky (Egypt) and Prof Milind Chitnis (South Africa).

=== Multimorbidity, age-related diseases and aging ===
Multimorbidity is "a growing public health problem worldwide", "likely driven by the ageing population but also by factors such as high body-mass index, urbanisation, and the growing burden of NCDs (such as type 2 diabetes) and tuberculosis in low- and middle-income countries (LMICs)". Around the world, many people do not die from one isolated condition but from a multitude of factors and conditions. A study suggested there is a paucity of multimorbidity and comorbidity data globally and mapped comorbidity patterns.

With aging populations, there is a rise of age-related diseases which puts major burdens on healthcare systems as well as contemporary economies or contemporary economics and their appendant societal systems. Healthspan extension and anti-aging research seek to extend the span of health in the old as well as slow aging or its negative impacts such as physical and mental decline. Modern anti-senescent and regenerative technology with augmented decision making could help "responsibly bridge the healthspan-lifespan gap for a future of equitable global wellbeing". Aging is "the most prevalent risk factor for chronic disease, frailty and disability, and it is estimated that there will be over 2 billion persons age > 60 by the year 2050", making it a large global health challenge that demands substantial (and well-orchestrated or efficient) efforts, including interventions that alter and target the inborn aging process.

=== Infertility crisis ===
A scientific review found that human sperm counts fell by 62% in the last 50 years, are decreasing at an accelerating rate and are decreasing worldwide, likely a result of factors such as poor diets, endocrine disruptors in prevalent products, unhealthy lifestyles and toxic forever chemicals in air and water.

== Health interventions ==
Global interventions for improved child health and survival include the promotion of breastfeeding, zinc supplementation, vitamin A fortification, salt iodization, hygiene interventions such as hand-washing, vaccinations, and treatments of severe acute malnutrition. The Global Health Council suggests a list of 32 treatments and health interventions that could potentially save several million lives each year.

Many populations face an "outcome gap", which refers to the gap between members of a population who have access to medical treatment versus those who do not. Countries facing outcome gaps lack sustainable infrastructure. In Guatemala, a subset of the public sector, the Programa de Accessibilidad a los Medicamentos ("Program for Access to Medicines"), had the lowest average availability (25%) compared to the private sector (35%). In the private sector, the highest- and lowest-priced medicines were 22.7 and 10.7 times more expensive than international reference prices respectively. Treatments were generally unaffordable, costing as much as 15 days wages for a course of the antibiotic ceftriaxone. The public sector in Pakistan, while having access to medicines at a lower price than international reference prices, has a chronic shortage of and lack of access to basic medicines.

Journalist Laurie Garrett argues that the field of global health is not plagued by a lack of funds, but that more funds do not always translate into positive outcomes. The problem lies in the way these funds are allocated, as they are often disproportionately allocated to alleviating a single disease.

Labor shortages

In its 2006 World Health Report, the WHO estimated a shortage of almost 4.3 million doctors, midwives, nurses, and support workers worldwide, especially in sub-Saharan Africa. A 2022 study estimated that, "in 2019, the world had 104.0 million (95% uncertainty interval 83.5–128.0) health workers, including 12.8 million (9.7–16.6) physicians, 29.8 million (23.3–37.7) nurses and midwives, 4.6 million (3.6–6.0) dentistry personnel, and 5.2 million (4.0–6.7) pharmaceutical personnel" and found that sub-Saharan Africa, south Asia, and north Africa and the Middle East had the lowest densities of human resources for health. However, even when only considering current technologies and processes (such as only little use of telehealth as of 2022), overall numbers of personnel and shortages do not consider sub-national geographic distribution of various types of health workers (or expertise).

== Global health security ==
The COVID-19 pandemic has highlighted how global health security is reliant on all countries around the world, including low- and middle-income countries, having strong health systems and at least a minimum of health research capacities. In an article 2020 in Annals of Global Health, the ESSENCE group outlined a mechanism for review of investment in health research capacity building in low- and middle-income countries. The review mechanism will give funders of research for health the information to identify the gaps in the capacity that exist in low- and middle-income countries and the opportunity to work together to address those disparities. The overall goal is increased, coordinated support of research on national health priorities as well as improved pandemic preparedness in LMICs, and, eventually, fewer countries with very limited health research capacity.

== Global factors impacting health ==
=== Climate change ===
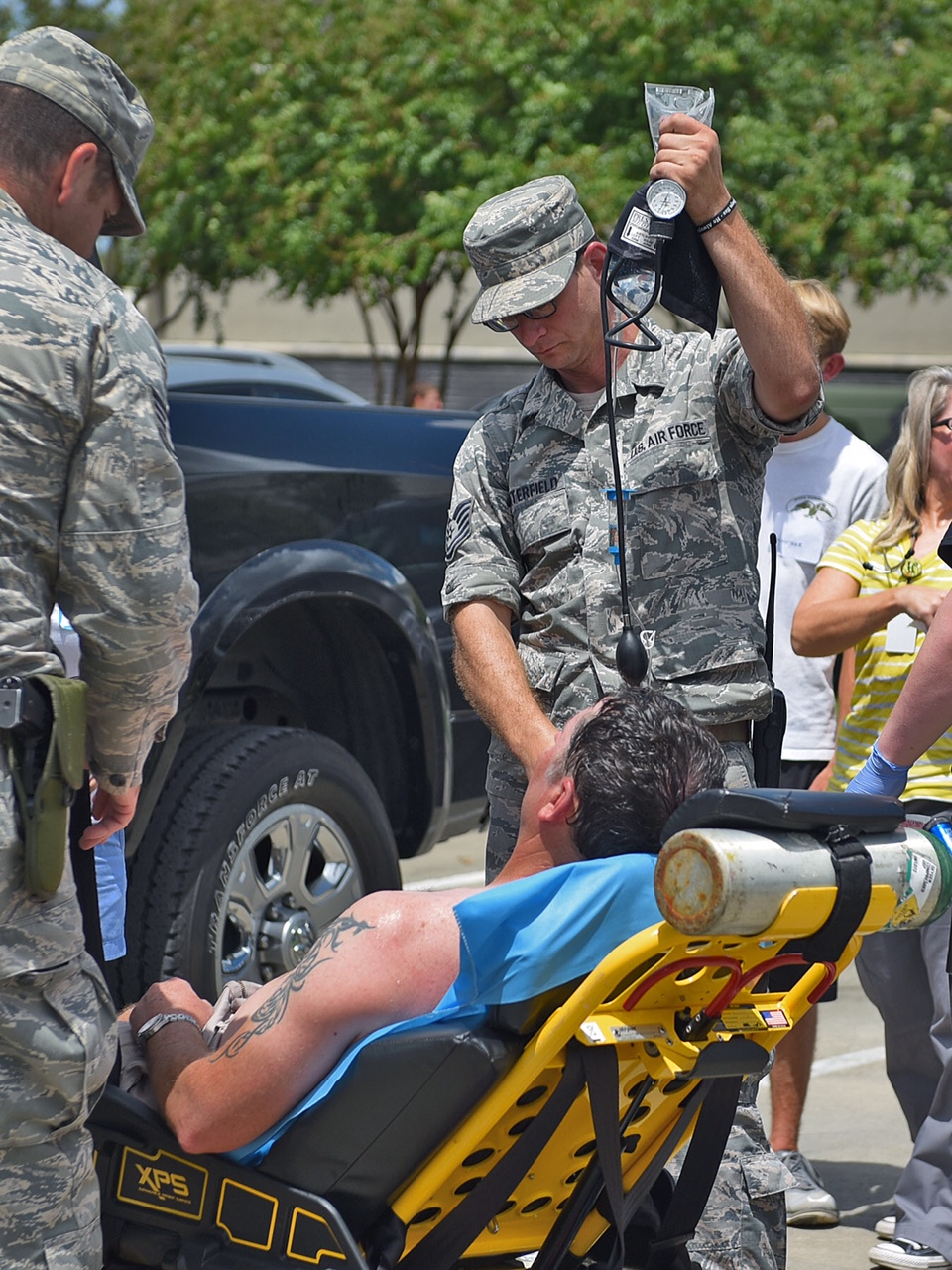
Heat stroke treatment at Baton Rouge during the 2016 Louisiana floods. Climate change is making heat waves more intense, leading to a higher risk of heat stroke.

Climate change affects human health in many ways, including an increase in heat-related illnesses and deaths, worsened air quality, the spread of infectious diseases, and health risks associated with extreme weather such as floods and storms. Rising global temperatures and changes in weather patterns are increasing the severity of heat waves and extreme weather events. These events in turn have direct and indirect impacts on human health. For example, when people are exposed to higher temperatures for longer time periods they might experience heat illness and heat-related death.

In addition to direct impacts, climate change and extreme weather events cause changes in biomes. Certain diseases that are carried and spread by living hosts such as mosquitoes and ticks (known as vectors) may become more common in some regions. Affected diseases include dengue fever and malaria. Contracting waterborne diseases such as diarrhoeal disease will also be more likely.

Changes in climate can cause decreasing yields for some crops and regions, resulting in higher food prices, less available food, and under nutrition. Climate change can also reduce access to clean and safe water supply. Extreme weather and its health impact can also threaten the livelihoods and economic stability of people. These factors together can lead to increasing poverty, human migration, violent conflict, and mental health issues.

Climate change affects human health at all ages, from infancy through adolescence, adulthood and old age. Factors such as age, gender and socioeconomic status influence to what extent these effects become wide-spread risks to human health. Some groups are more vulnerable than others to the health effects of climate change. These include children, the elderly, outdoor workers and disadvantaged people.

A comprehensive annually scheduled study finds climate change is "undermining every dimension of global health monitored" and reports dire conclusions from tracking of impact indicators. The effects of climate change have also increased the risk of health conditions, such as lung disease or asthma which are caused by air pollution. These medical conditions are caused due to extreme heatwaves or by "higher concentrations of ground-level ozone".

=== Antimicrobial resistance ===
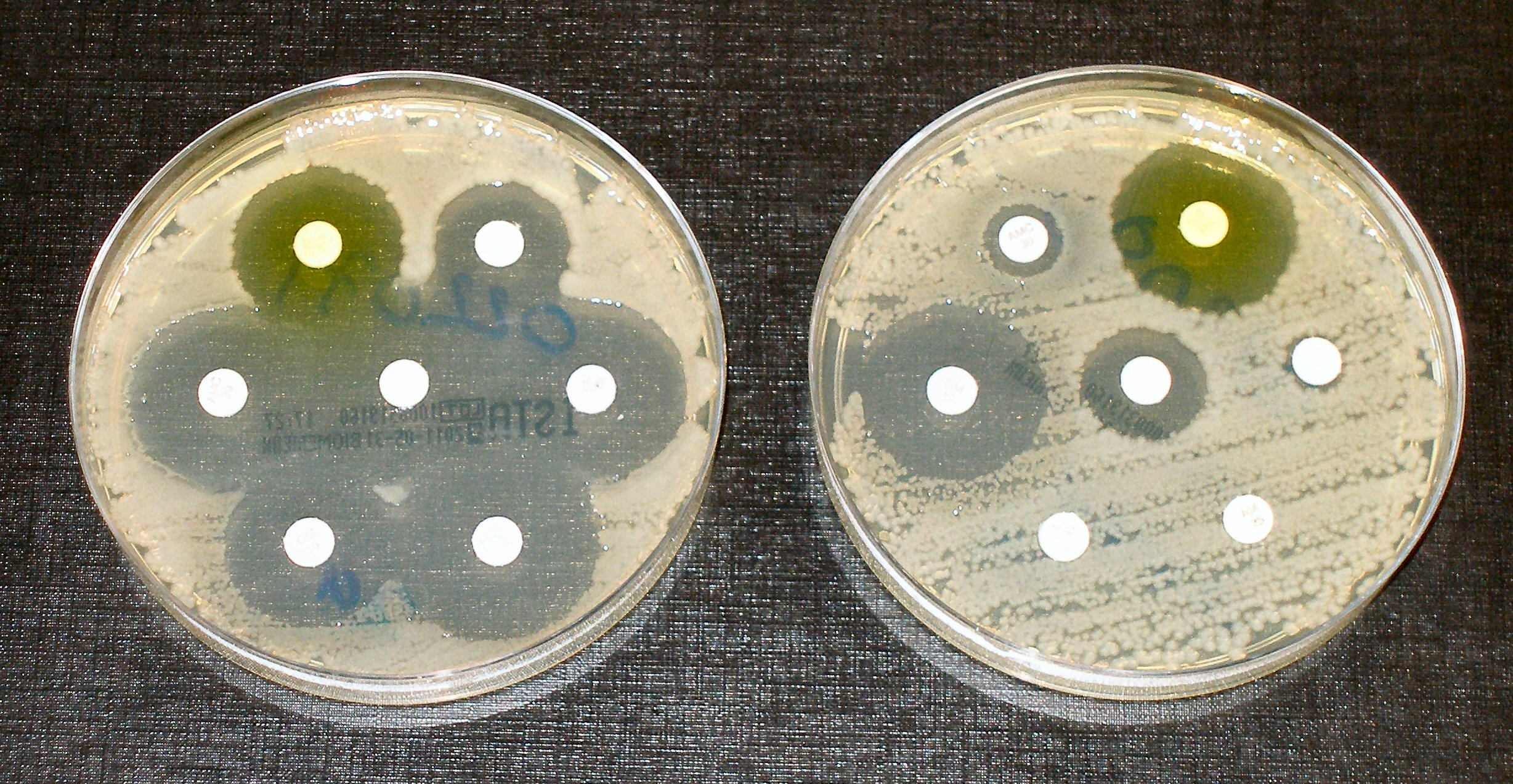
Antibiotic resistance tests: Bacteria are streaked on solid medium in Petri dishes and paper disks are laid on the surface, each impregnated with a different antibiotic. Clear rings, such as those on the left, show that bacteria have not grown around the disks, indicating that these bacteria are not resistant. The bacteria on the right are fully resistant to three of seven and partially resistant to two of seven antibiotics tested.

Antimicrobial resistance (AMR or AR) occurs when microbes evolve mechanisms that protect them from antimicrobials, which are drugs used to treat infections in humans, animals, and plants. Any microbe can develop resistance, including bacteria (antibiotic resistance), viruses (antiviral resistance), parasites (antiparasitic resistance), and fungi (antifungal resistance). Together, these adaptations fall under the AMR umbrella, posing a challenge to all countries and all demographics. Misuse and improper management of antimicrobials are primary drivers of this resistance, though it can also occur naturally through genetic mutations and the spread of resistant genes. Microbes resistant to multiple drugs are termed multidrug-resistant (MDR) and are sometimes called superbugs.

Antibiotic resistance is a serious result of AMR. Resistance arises through spontaneous mutation, horizontal gene transfer, and increased selective pressure from antibiotic overuse, both in medicine and agriculture, which accelerates resistance development. Preventive measures, such as using narrow-spectrum antibiotics and improving hygiene practices, aim to reduce the spread of resistance.

The World Health Organization (WHO) claims that AMR is one of the top global public health and development threats, estimating that bacterial AMR was directly responsible for 1.27 million global deaths in 2019 and contributed to over 4 million deaths in 2021. The burden of AMR is immense, with nearly 5 million annual deaths associated with resistant infections. Infections from AMR microbes are more challenging to treat and often require costly alternative therapies that may have more severe side effects. Moreover, the WHO and other international bodies warn that AMR could lead to up to 10 million deaths annually by 2050 unless actions are taken. Global initiatives, such as calls for international AMR treaties, emphasize coordinated efforts to limit misuse, fund research, and provide access to necessary antimicrobials in developing nations. However, the COVID-19 pandemic redirected resources and scientific attention away from AMR, intensifying the challenge.

In 2026, Israeli scientists announced the discovery of bacteria able to create dozens of copies of genes which help them survive antibiotics.

AMR has been described as a leading global health issue. Globally, 1.27 million deaths in 2019 were attributable to AMR. That year, AMR may have contributed to 5 million deaths and one in five people who died due to AMR were children under five years old.

== Organization ==
Governmental or inter-governmental organizations focused on global health include:

- The United Nations
  - World Health Organization
    - International Agency for Research on Cancer (IARC)
    - WHO Centre for Health Development (WKC)
  - United Nations Children's Fund (UNICEF)
  - World Food Programme (WFP)
- Pan American Health Organization (PAHO)
- International Committee of the Red Cross
- Centers for Disease Control and Prevention (CDC)
- The Global Fund to Fight AIDS, Tuberculosis and Malaria
- President's Emergency Plan for AIDS Relief (PEPFAR)

Non-governmental organizations focused on global health include:

- Médecins Sans Frontières (Doctors Without Borders, MSF)
- Bill & Melinda Gates Foundation
- Global AMR R&D Hub

=== Governments and analysis ===
A study of select global health related organizations and initiatives suggests that major trends in global health governance appear to be "towards more discretionary funding and away from core or longer-term funding; towards defined multi-stakeholder governance and away from traditional government-centred representation and decision-making; and towards narrower mandates or problem-focused vertical initiatives and away from broader systemic goals". There is a growing willingness to use militaries in state-led support of global health efforts which have capabilities ranging from "research, surveillance, and medical expertise to rapidly deployable, large-scale assets for logistics, transportation, and security".

=== Global Health Security Agenda ===
The Global Health Security Agenda (GHSA) is "a multilateral, multi-sector effort that includes 60 participating countries and numerous private and public international organizations focused on building up worldwide health security capabilities toward meeting such threats" as the spread of infectious disease. On March 26–28, 2018, the GHSA held a high-level meeting in Tbilisi, Georgia, on biosurveillance of infectious disease threats, "which include such modern-day examples as HIV/AIDS, severe acute respiratory syndrome (SARS), H1N1 influenza, multi-drug resistant tuberculosis—any emerging or reemerging disease that threatens human health and global economic stability". This event brought together GHSA partner countries, contributing countries of Real-Time Surveillance Action Package, and international partner organizations supporting the strengthening of capacities to detect infectious disease threats within the Real-Time Surveillance Action Package and other cross-cutting packages.

GHSA works through four main mechanisms of member action, action packages, task forces and international cooperation. In 2015, the Steering Group of the GHSA agreed upon the implementation of their commitments through 11 Action Packages. Action Packages are a commitment by member countries and their partners to work collaboratively towards development and implementation of International Health Regulations (IHR). Action packages are based on GHSA's aim to strengthen national and international capacity to prevent, detect, and respond to infectious disease threats. Each action package consists of five-year targets, measures of progress, desired impacts, country commitments, and list of baseline assessments. The Joint External Evaluation process, derived as part of the IHR Monitoring and Evaluation Framework is an assessment of a country's capacity for responding to public health threats. So far, G7 partners and EU have made a collective commitment to assist 76 countries whereas the US committed to helping 32 countries to achieve GHSA targets for IHR implementation. In September 2014, a pilot tool was developed to measure progress of the Action Packages and applied in countries (Georgia, Peru, Uganda, Portugal, the United Kingdom, and Ukraine) that volunteered to participate in an external assessment.

== See also ==
- Priority-setting in global health
- Health system
- Health economics
- Planetary health
- Public health
- Social determinants of health
- Universal health care
- Migrant health
- Child health and nutrition in Africa
- Global Strategy for Women's and Children's Health
- CAB Direct — Global Health database
- Global neurosurgery
