= Whoa =

Whoa may refer to:

- A voice command asking a horse to stop

== Songs ==
- "Whoa!" (Black Rob song), 2000
- "Whoa" (Earl Sweatshirt song), 2013
- "Whoa" (Lil Kim song), 2006
- "Whoa", by Paramore from All We Know Is Falling, 2005
- "Whoa", by Snoh Aalegra from Ugh, Those Feels Again, 2019
- "Whoa!", by Soul Asylum from Made to Be Broken, 1986
- "Whoa", by the Soviettes from LP III, 2005
- "Whoa", by We the Kings from We the Kings, 2007
- "Whoa (Mind in Awe)", by XXXTentacion from Skins, 2018

== Other media ==
- Whoa, a character in the film Kung Pow! Enter the Fist
- "Whoa!", character Joey Russo's catchphrase on the television show Blossom
- Whoa!, a newspaper in the Regional Municipality of Peel, Ontario, Canada

== See also ==
- Woah (disambiguation)
- Whoa, Nelly!, an album by Nelly Furtado
- "Whoa Oh! (Me vs. Everyone)", a song by Forever the Sickest Kids
- "Like Whoa", a song by Aly & AJ
