= Global AMR R&D Hub =

International organisation initiated by the G20

Global Antimicrobial Resistance Research and Development Hub
- Formation: 2017; 9 years ago
- Founders: G20 Members (during 2017 G20 Hamburg summit )
- Type: International organization
- Headquarters: Berlin, Germany
- Region served: Worldwide
- Members: 22: Australia, Brazil, Canada, China, European Commission, France, Germany, India, Italy, Japan, The Netherlands, Norway, Russia, South Africa, Spain, Sweden, Switzerland, Turkey, United Kingdom, United States of America, Gates Foundation, Wellcome Trust
- Key people: Lesley Ogilvie (Director); Ralf Sudbrak (Deputy Director)
- Website: globalamrhub.org

The Global Antimicrobial Resistance Research and Development Hub (hereafter referred to as the Hub) is an international organization initiated under the auspices of the German G20 presidency. The Hub was established to support global coordination in antimicrobial resistance (AMR), or drug resistance, which the World Health Organization has identified as one of the top global health threats, with a particular focus on research and development (R&D).

Launched in May 2018, the Hub operates with a Secretariat based in Berlin, supported by the German government. It is guided by a Board of Members, comprising representatives from 19 countries, the European Commission, Gates Foundation, and Wellcome Trust, along with five Observers, including WHO, FAO, OECD, WOAH, and Africa CDC, and a Stakeholder Group representing a broad spectrum of interests from academia, industry, funding bodies, and civil society.

The Hub focuses on strengthening research and development efforts and promoting sustainable investment in the AMR field through a One Health approach. Its activities include coordinating international initiatives, supporting innovation, and improving the alignment of investments in AMR R&D. AMR experts have described the Hub as a mechanism for coordinating international responses to AMR.

== Activities ==
The Global AMR R&D Hub's activities focus on promoting AMR research and development. These activities are structured around three core pillars, which collectively aim to streamline global efforts against AMR.

=== Advocacy and Policymaker Engagement ===
The Hub engages with policymakers by providing up-to-date analysis and information on AMR R&D.

Its data and analyses have been featured in several high-level reports, including those prepared for G7 Finance and Health Ministers in collaboration with the WHO, which assess progress in strengthening the AMR R&D pipeline, as well as in publications of the Global Leaders Group on Antimicrobial Resistance, and have been cited in major media outlets, including Politico and Germany's Tagesspiegel.

The Hub has participated in discussions on AMR R&D at high-level fora such as the United Nations General Assembly, Germany's Parliamentary Group on Antimicrobial Resistance (PKAMR), Tokyo AMR One-Health Conference, among others.

Since its establishment, the Hub has been referenced in G20 outcome documents under every presidency, including Leaders’ Declarations, ministerial communiqués, and Chair’s summaries; several of these documents also acknowledge or support its role.

=== Support Evidence-based Decision Making ===
The Hub provides data on AMR R&D activities and funding through its Dynamic Dashboard, which is used by policymakers, researchers, and private sector stakeholders to assess ongoing initiatives and identify gaps.

The Hub has highlighted the role of both "push" and "pull" incentives in supporting AMR R&D. These incentives are designed to stimulate R&D activities, by reducing costs and risks ("push") and rewarding successful outcomes ("pull"), as mechanisms to support research and development activities.

=== Encouraging Collaboration ===
The Hub facilitates collaboration among international stakeholders involved in AMR R&D. This includes engagement with public, private, and academic partners. For instance, the former Director General for Vaccines and Therapeutic Readiness at the Public Health Agency of Canada noted that the data and collaboration provided by the Hub helped shape "Canada's Antibiotic Access Pilot Project". It also collaborates with academic institutions such as the Institute of Urban Environment at the Chinese Academy of Sciences to apply advanced technologies, including artificial intelligence, in analysing the AMR R&D landscape.

An external evaluation of the Global AMR R&D Hub's activities between 2018 and 2021, conducted by the European research and policy analysis centre PPMI, concluded that "the Hub achieved considerable progress towards its objectives during its first three years of operation".
