= Global neurosurgery =

Global health subspecialty

Global neurosurgery is a field at the intersection of public health and clinical neurosurgery. It aims to expand provision of improved and equitable neurosurgical care globally.

== Definition and history ==
Global neurosurgery is "the clinical and public health practice of neurosurgery with the primary purpose of ensuring timely, safe, and affordable neurosurgical care to all who need it." The term global neurosurgery was first used in 1995 by Canadian neurosurgeon Dwight Parkinson to describe comprehensive clinical neurosurgery care in Manitoba; however, the field as defined today was born in the mid-2010s. The modern definition of global neurosurgery was born from a combination of global health and neurosurgery. Hence, global neurosurgery is conceived as a subspecialty of global health within global surgery.

== Burden of diseases amenable to neurosurgery ==
Around 22.6 million people are affected by diseases amenable to neurosurgery each year, and 13.8 million require surgical intervention. The burden of diseases amenable to neurosurgery is disproportionately distributed globally, with low- and middle-income countries bearing more than 78.1% of cases. Low- and middle-income countries lack the workforce, infrastructure, funding, and data needed to address the disease burden. High-income country patients, especially in rural areas and from economically disadvantaged backgrounds, face unique challenges in accessing safe, timely, and affordable neurosurgical care. For this reason, most global neurosurgery work has focused on access to care in low- and middle-incomce countries despite the global nature of disparities in accessing neurosurgical care.

== Practice ==
Global neurosurgery practice involves advocacy, education, policy, research, and service delivery. The components of global neurosurgery practice are interdependent but global neurosurgeons tend to focus their practice on one or two of them. This trend has allowed for specialization within the field and greater collaboration between individuals and institutions.

=== Advocacy ===
Advocacy efforts happen at the international, regional, and local levels and in collaboration with health initiatives that share similar goals with global neurosurgery - universal health coverage and sustainable development. Internationally, global neurosurgery advocacy groups participate in high-level health policy events like the World Health Assembly and the United Nations General Assembly. Global neurosurgery advocates have contributed to numerous high-level decisions including folate fortification, detection and management of congenital malformations, and injury prevention. Locally, global neurosurgery advocacy groups are constituted of health workers and other patient advocates. These groups affect local decision making but they are equally active internationally. Many local advocacy groups are members of international advocacy groups like the G4 Alliance, People and Organisations United for Spina Bifida and Hydrocephalus (PUSH!) Global Alliance, and International Federation Spina Bifida and Hydrocephalus (IFSBH). Local global neurosurgery advocacy groups work within these international organizations to coordinate advocacy efforts regionally and globally.

=== Education ===
Global neurosurgery education focuses on two aspects. First, global neurosurgery educators train specialists to serve under-resourced regions. The training focuses primarily on safe and quality service delivery within underserved communities. These global neurosurgery education efforts can be divided into non-specialized and specialized training. Non-specialized training or education for task-sharing/-shifting targets non-specialized healthcare workers such as general surgeons, clinical officers, and general practitioners. Non-specialized training is especially important in increasing access to essential and emergency neurosurgical care rapidly. Non-specialized training, unlike specialized training, can be done in shorter periods, with larger cohorts, and with fewer resources. Specialized neurosurgery training can last anywhere from a few months to 8 years depending on the training level. Postgraduate medical fellowships in one of the neurosurgical subspecialties are open to graduate neurosurgery residents/registrars and can last between three and 24 months. On the other hand, neurosurgery residencies last between 4 and 8 years.

The other focus of global neurosurgery education is fellowships that introduce trainees to global and public health concepts. Global neurosurgery fellowships are relatively new but increasingly popular with institutions like Cambridge, Cornell, Duke, Harvard, and the University of Cape Town offering specialized training.

=== Policy ===
Global neurosurgeons contribute significantly to the design and implementation of health policies that improve access to safe, timely, and affordable neurosurgical care globally. Prime examples of global neurosurgery policy efforts include the comprehensive health policy guidelines for traumatic brain and spine injuries and for spina bifida and hydrocephalus. The comprehensive policy guidelines address challenges that affect the patient continuum of care and suggest solutions for every component of the healthcare system. These documents were designed for policymakers in areas with a large burden of diseases amenable to neurosurgery. Traumatic brain and spine injuries were chosen because they constitute more than 47.1% of the global neurosurgical disease burden while hydrocephalus and spina bifida were chosen for their deleterious impact on children.

=== Research ===
Research is an indispensable aspect of global neurosurgery practice called academic global neurosurgery. Academic global neurosurgery has a broad focus and uses concepts from epidemiology, health economics, health policy, health services, health systems, implementation & dissemination science, and patient safety & quality improvement research. Academic global neurosurgery's exponential growth since 2016 is the result of increased interest and support from the neurosurgical community characterized by the creation of an ad-hoc committee within the World Federation of Neurosurgical Societies, publication of special issues in reputable peer-reviewed journals, creation of a specialized journal, and the creation of global neurosurgery centers. Academic global neurosurgery identifies challenges to accessing neurosurgical care and proposes solutions that increase access to care. The evidence generated by academic global neurosurgery informs the other aspects of global neurosurgery practice.

=== Service delivery ===
Service delivery is the oldest component of global neurosurgery practice and can be traced back to the colonial era when surgeons would deliver care in colonies. Global neurosurgery aims to reduce barriers to essential and emergency neurosurgery procedures such as those needed for acute stroke, neural tube defects, traumatic brain injuries, and traumatic spine injuries.

Low- and middle-income country patients have worse outcomes than their high-income country counterparts because they regularly face barriers to accessing timely and safe neurosurgical care.

The workforce deficit in low- and middle-income countries constitutes a significant barrier to receiving care. Although former colonies have trained local neurosurgeons since their independence, the neurosurgical workforce density in many low- and middle-income countries remains below the World Federation of Neurosurgical Societies' recommendation of 1 neurosurgeon per 200,000 people. In addition, the majority of low- and middle income countries have geographical disparities in the neurosurgical workforce with most neurosurgeons working in urban areas whereas the majority of people in these countries are rural-dwellers. In addition, surgical non-governmental organizations from high-income countries help fill the service delivery gap in some low- and middle-income countries. Although most neurosurgical non-governmental organizations offer short-term service delivery in low- and middle-income countries, some like CURE International offer long-term care.

The neurosurgical workforce in low- and middle-income countries has increased gradually in the past decade thanks to targeted efforts from the global neurosurgery community. For example, the World Federation of Neurosurgical Societies supports the training of aspiring neurosurgeons from understaffed countries through scholarships at accredited centers in Africa, Asia, and South America.

Young neurosurgeons from under-resourced regions who have been trained in advanced neurosurgical techniques report their patients do not get safe and timely care because of inadequate infrastructure. Access to neurosurgical infrastructure can be assessed summarily using the World Federation of Neurosurgical Societies facility three-tier classification or using hospital assessment tools. The World Federation of Neurosurgical Societies facility three-tier classification groups facilities into level 1 (equipment for emergency neurosurgery procedures), level 2 (equipment to perform basic microneurosurgical procedures), and level 3 (equipment for complex and advanced neurosurgery).
