= WHO Centre for Health Development =

Agency of the United Nations

Coordinates: 34°41′56.42″N 135°13′0.02″E

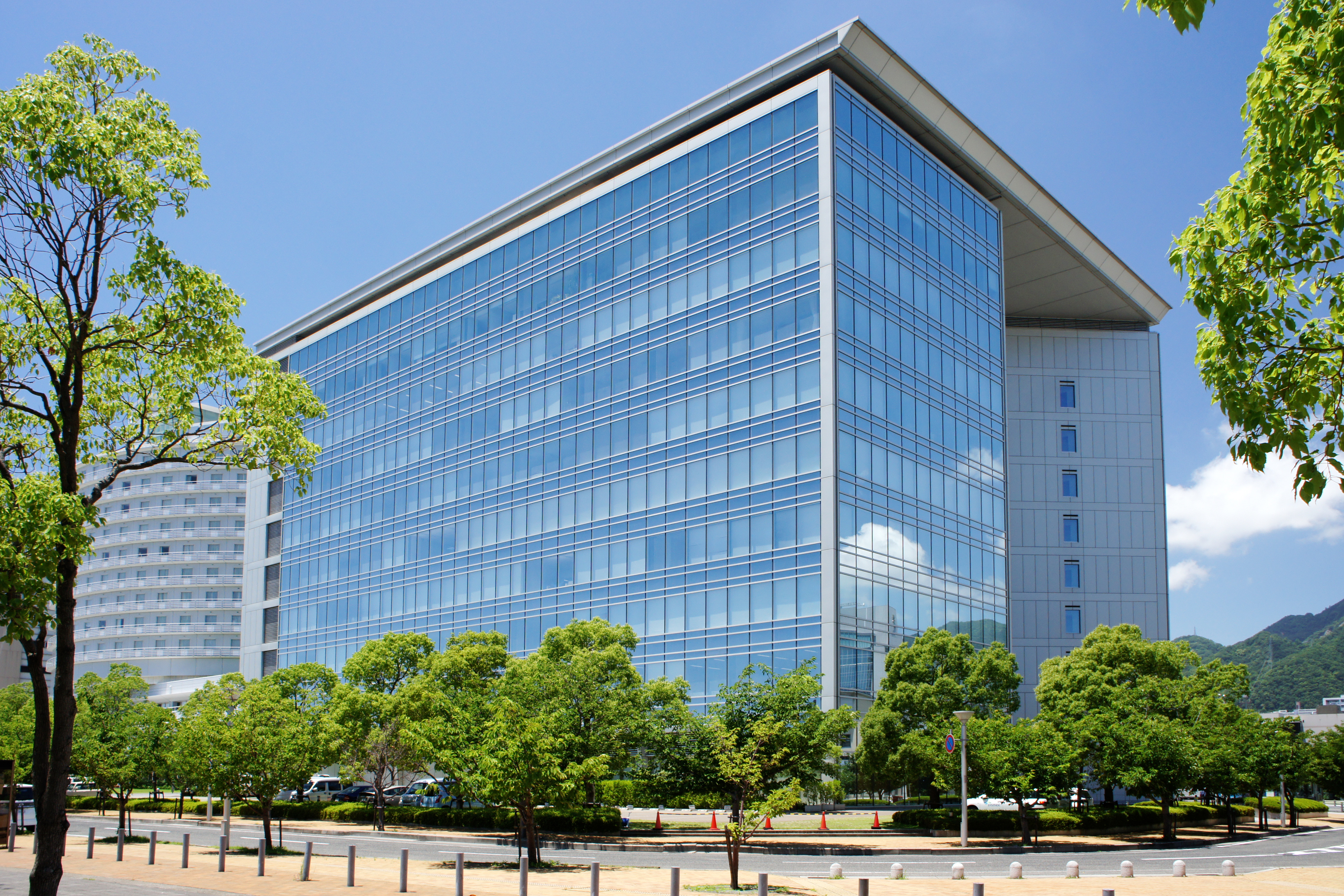
WHO Centre for Health Development (Kobe)

The WHO Centre for Health Development (WKC) is an intergovernmental agency forming part of the World Health Organization of the United Nations, as one of the centres in the WHO Health Systems and Innovation Cluster. The main office is located in Kobe, Japan. It is commonly known as the WHO Kobe Centre, which is the origin of its acronym, WKC. The initial proposal to establish a centre in Kobe City was made to the World Health Organization (WHO) by the Governor of Hyogo Prefecture and the Mayor of Kobe City in December 1990, as a contribution to international health work.

Its role is to nurture, support and sustain excellence and innovation in public health research on health in development. It describes its vision as "Innovations for sustainable universal health coverage".

A joint statement issued by a recent ASEAN-Japan Health Ministers Meeting on Universal Health Coverage And Population Ageing held in July 2017 in Tokyo noted that WHO Kobe Centre plays the central role in promoting joint research and knowledge management on Universal Health Coverage (UHC) in ASEAN Member States and Japan.

== See also ==
- World Health Organization
- International Agency for Research on Cancer
