= Woah =

Woah or WOAH may refer to

- "Woah" (song), by Lil Baby, 2019
- WOAH (FM), a radio station licensed to Glennville, Georgia, United States
- Warcraft: Orcs and Humans, a 1994 video game won 2 game of the year awards
- World Organisation for Animal Health, an international veterinary organisation

== See also ==
- Whoa (disambiguation)
