= Reda bin Mohammed Saeed Obeid =

Saudi academic and civil servant (1936–2026)

President of King Abdulaziz University
- In office 1984–1994
- Preceded by: Abdullah Omar Nasseef
- Succeeded by: Ossama bin Abdul Majed Shobokshi

Member of the Consultative Assembly of Saudi Arabia
- In office 1994–1998

Personal details
- Born: 20 January 1936
- Died: 2 April 2026 (aged 90)
- Education: Cairo University (B.S.)
- Scientific career
- Education: King Abdulaziz University
- Fields: Science
- Workplaces: King Abdulaziz University

Reda bin Mohammed Saeed Obeid (20 January 1936 – 2 April 2026) was a Saudi academic and civil servant who served as president of King Abdulaziz University from 1984 to 1994 and was a member of the Shura Council of Saudi Arabia from 1994 to 1998. As of 2025, he served as chairman of the Board of Directors of Al Yamamah Press Establishment.

== Early life and education ==
Obeid was born in Medina in 1936. He earned a bachelor’s degree in Science, majoring in Chemistry and Physics, from Cairo University in 1958. He later obtained a PhD in Physical Chemistry, specializing in Polymer Chemistry, from the University of Birmingham in the United Kingdom in 1962.

== Career ==
Obeid began his academic career as a teaching assistant at the College of Science, King Saud University, between 1958 and 1959. After completing his doctoral studies, he was appointed Professor of Physical Chemistry at the same university. He served as Vice Dean, and later as Dean of the College of Science from 1963 to 1971, becoming the first Saudi national to hold the position.

From 1977 to 1984, Obeid chaired the National Center for Science and Technology at the King Abdulaziz City for Science and Technology (KACST). In 1984, he was appointed President of King Abdulaziz University, a role he held for a decade until 1994.

Following his presidency, Obeid was appointed to the Shura Council, where he served from 1994 to 1998.

== Death ==
Obeid died on 2 April 2026.

== Honours and awards ==
Reda Obeid has received decorations and medals from various countries, including:

- Order of the Brilliant Star from the President of the Republic of China.
- Order of Distinguished Commander from the President of the Republic of France.
- Order of Merit of the Federal Republic of Germany
- Knowledge Medal for GCC Leaders, awarded by the kings and princes of the Gulf Cooperation Council during its 10th summit held in Muscat, Oman, in 1989.
