= Scouting and Guiding in Saudi Arabia =

The Scout and Guide movement in Saudi Arabia is served by

- Saudi Arabian Boy Scouts Association, member of the World Organization of the Scout Movement
- Although Saudi Arabia does have a Guiding organization, the Girl Guides of Saudi Arabia, work towards World Association of Girl Guides and Girl Scouts membership recognition remains unclear.
