= Mohammed bin Omar Zubair =

President of King Abdulaziz University

- محمد بن عمر زبير

President of King Abdulaziz University
- In office 1976–1979
- Preceded by: Ahmed Mohammed Ali Al-Madani
- Succeeded by: Abdullah Omar Nasseef

Personal details
- Born: 1932
- Died: March 18, 2021
- Education: University of Connecticut (PhD Economics)
- Occupation: Academic, university administrator
- Known for: Former President of King Abdulaziz University

Mohammed bin Omar Zubair (1932–2021) was a former President of King Abdulaziz University. He was the third person to hold this position since the university's establishment, serving from 1976 to 1979.

== Personal life and education ==
Zubair was born in 1932. He earned his PhD in Economics from the University of Connecticut in the United States in 1970.

== Career ==
He began his career as an expert at the Central Planning Authority in 1965. He was later appointed Dean of the Faculty of Economics and Administration at King Abdulaziz University in Jeddah from 1971 to 1973, then served as the University's Secretary-General, followed by Vice President, and eventually as President from 1971 until the end of 1979.

In addition to his academic work, Zubair held several prominent roles outside the university, including:

- Chairman of the Scientific Committee at the Islamic Research and Training Institute, affiliated with the Islamic Development Bank in Jeddah.
- Founding member and later President of the International Association for Islamic Economics in London.
- Expert participant in the sessions of the Islamic Fiqh Academy under the Organization of Islamic Cooperation, and contributor to seminars organized by the International Association of Islamic Banks.
- Member of the special committee tasked with evaluating the performance of the Islamic Development Bank.

== Publications ==
Among his works is "The Role of the State in Achieving the Objectives of the Islamic Economy," published in 1424 AH / 2003 CE (ISBN 9960320251).

== Awards ==
The Islamic Development Bank, headquartered in Jeddah, awarded Dr. Mohammed Omar Zubair the Islamic Economics Prize for the year 1994, in recognition of his pioneering efforts and dedicated contributions to the development of modern Islamic economic thought.

== Death ==
Mohammed died on Sunday, March 18, 2021, while performing the Dhuhr prayer at the mosque near his home in the Prince Fawaz Al-Janoubi neighborhood of Jeddah.
