= Eastern Mediterranean =

Countries that are geographically located to the east of the Mediterranean Sea

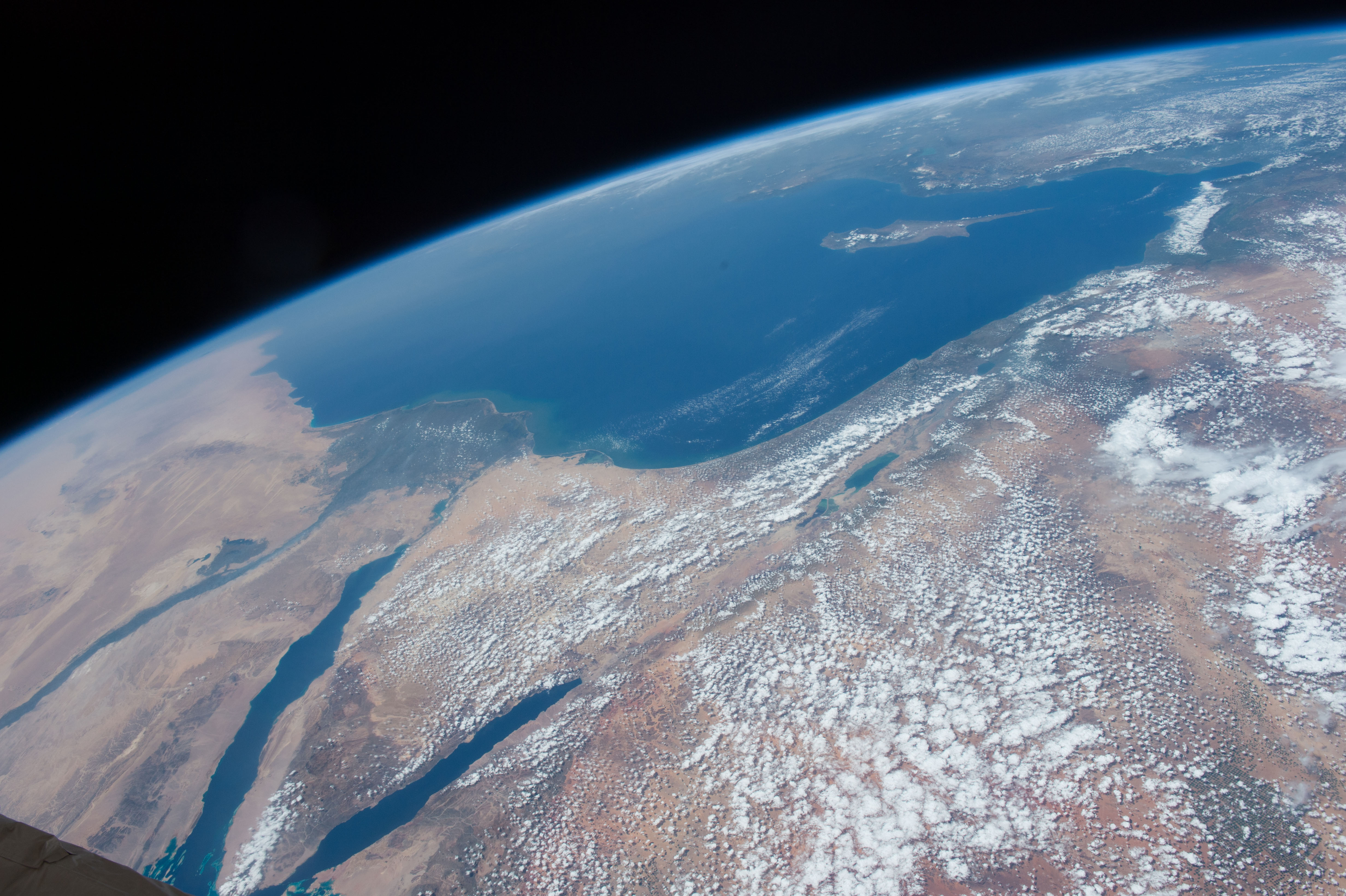
Aerial view of the Eastern Mediterranean

The Eastern Mediterranean is a loosely delimited region comprising the easternmost portion of the Mediterranean Sea, as well as the adjoining land—often defined as the countries around the Levantine Sea. It includes the southern half of Turkey's main region, Anatolia; its smaller Hatay Province; the island of Cyprus; the Greek Dodecanese islands; and the countries of Syria, Lebanon, Israel, Palestine and Egypt.

Although Jordan does not border the Mediterranean Sea, it is sometimes included in broader Levantine or Eastern Mediterranean frameworks for historical, cultural, or political analysis, as is sometimes Saudi Arabia - Jordan and the Saudis not least for their involvement in the Arab–Israeli conflict. In its broadest use, the term can encompass the Libyan Sea (thus Libya), the rest of Greece and Turkey (the Aegean Sea with European Turkey and the Greek mainland and remaining islands), and the Ionian Sea (thus Southern Albania in Southeast Europe) and can extend west to Italy's farthest south-eastern coasts.

== Regions ==
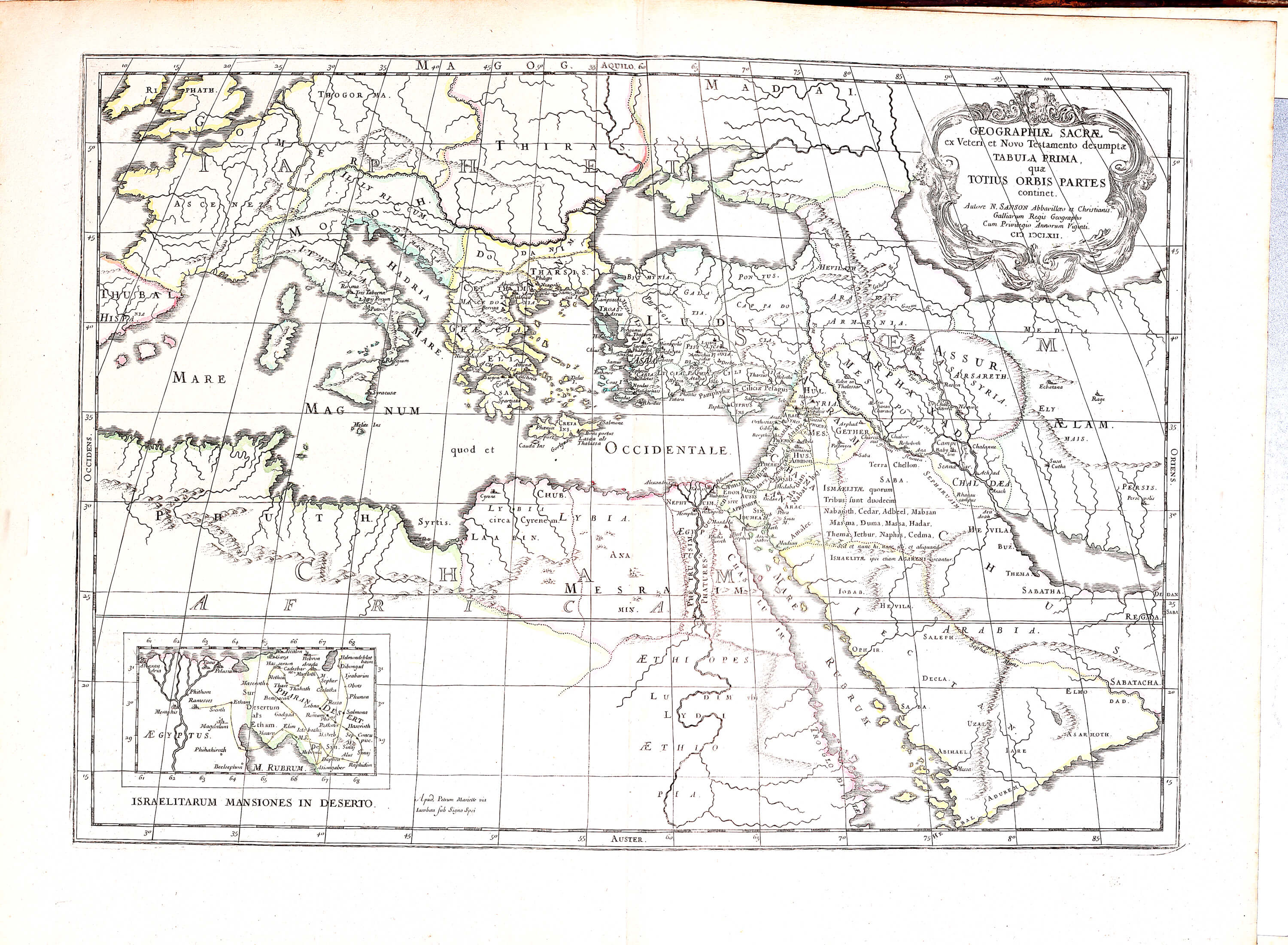
Nicolas Sanson, Map of Eastern Mediterranean, 1651.

The eastern Mediterranean region is commonly interpreted in two ways:

- The Levant, including its historically tied neighboring countries, Balkans and islands of Greece.
- The region of Syria with the island of Cyprus (also known as the Levant), Egypt, Greek Dodecanese and Anatolian Turkey.

The World Health Organization (WHO) divides the world into six WHO regions, for the purposes of reporting, analysis and administration. In this context, the Eastern Mediterranean Region (EMR) is one of those six WHO regions.

== Countries ==
The countries and territories of the Eastern Mediterranean include Cyprus, Turkey (Anatolia), its smaller Hatay Province, the Greek Dodecanese islands, and the countries of Lebanon, Syria, Israel, Palestine, Jordan and Egypt.

North-eastern Mediterranean has been put to print as a term for the Greater Balkans: Albania, Bosnia and Herzegovina, Bulgaria, Croatia, Greece, Slovenia, North Macedonia, Serbia, Kosovo, Montenegro, Romania. A five-author statistics-rich study of 2019 has sought to add Moldova and Ukraine beyond, which others link more to the Black Sea's economy and history. The three-word term is mainly a complex euphemism for the Balkan Peninsula used by those who stigmatise the word "Balkanisation" and to suggest parallels with other conflicts of the Eastern Mediterranean.

WHO regions; yellow: WHO/Eastern Mediterranean Region)

The WHO Regional Office for the Eastern Mediterranean includes the Eastern Mediterranean as well as the other regions of contiguous Afro-Eurasia: West Asia, North Africa, the Horn of Africa, Central Asia, Afghanistan, and Pakistan.

== See also ==
- The region of Syria
- Fertile Crescent
- Indo-Mediterranean
- Near East
- Ancient Near East
- Names of the Levant
- Eastern Mediterranean University
- List of Mediterranean countries
- Mediterranean Basin
- WHO Regional Office for the Eastern Mediterranean
- Greater Middle East
