= Khansaa Alshiha =

Saudi Arabian academic

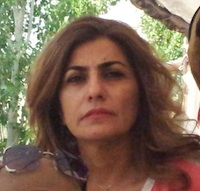
- Born: July 3, 1971 (age 54); Jeddah, Saudi Arabia
- Education: King Abdulaziz University (BA/MA, Sociology); Boston University (PhD, Applied Sociology)
- Occupations: Academic; researcher
- Children: 3

Khansaa Alshiha (Arabic: "خنساء عبدالصمد الشيحة", born 1971) is a Saudi Arabian academic, researcher, and civil rights activist. Alshiha has Ph.D in Applied Sociology.

== Biography ==
Khansaa Alshiha was born in Jeddah, Saudi Arabia (July 3, 1971) to Saudi Arabian father Abdulsamad Khalid Shiha from Riyadh, Saudi Arabia and to a Saudi Arabian mother of Lebanese origin Feryal Hakami. Married to a Saudi businessman and has a daughter and two sons: Luna, Rami and Karam. In her late childhood, she moved with her parents to the United States, where her father was studying his Master's and then PhD. After her parents divorced, Khansaa accompanied her mother to live in Paris, France. But her mother returned to Jeddah after the death of her father, a Saudi businessman of Lebanese origin Rajab Hakami to take care of her mother Bahia Gattas. Khansaa attained her bachelor's degree in sociology from the King Abdulaziz University in Jeddah. After graduation, she went to Paris to stay at her aunt Samira Hakami, a French journalist and a women's rights activist. Khansaa worked as a journalist assistant in Paris for three years. After a pressure from her father, Khansaa returned to Jeddah, then attained her Masters of Arts in Sociology from the King Abdulaziz University. After her marriage, Khansaa moved to live with her husband in Massachusetts, United States a period of time. Later, Khansaa attained her Ph.D from Boston University in Applied Sociology. She speaks fluent Arabic, English and French.

== Research Interests ==
Khansaa AlShiha has many research and social studies published in the academic press in Boston University in the U.S. Her interests in field work helped to create database configuration and social networks used in many of the social studies and statistical analysis of social groups. Field tours comprising the United States, Saudi Arabia, Lebanon and France.

== Career ==
Khansaa Alshiha worked as a Journalist assistant in a Paris-based newspaper. After receiving her Ph.D, Khansaa has been a Research-based occupations in civil, strategic, social، cultural and economic planning organizations across the Middle East and the U.S. Khansaa worked for one semester as a graduate-assistant in the American University of Beirut in Lebanon. She has held several occupations varied between academic, co-researcher, visiting fellow, fellow and consultant analyst since then.
