= Abdullah al-Fahad =

Saudi Arabian academic (born 1966)

Dr. Abdullah bin Suleiman al-Fahad (Arabic: عبدالله بن سليمان الفهد) of Riyadh, Saudi Arabia (born October 16, 1966) is one of 12 elected volunteer members of the World Scout Committee, the main executive body of the World Organization of the Scout Movement. Alfahad served as Vice President of the Assembly of Scouting of the Saudi Arabian Boy Scouts Association, officially opened the Saudi delegation's exhibition at the 21st World Scout Jamboree in 2007, served as Chairman of the Arab Scout Committee and was elected to the World Scout Committee at the 39th World Scout Conference in Brazil in January 2011. His term on the World Scout Committee will expire at the 40th World Scout Conference in Ljubljana, Slovenia in 2014, but he will be eligible for re-election for one additional term.

Alfahad is a full professor at the Imam Muhammad ibn Saud Islamic University in Riyadh.
