= Abdulrahman Obaid Al-Youbi =

President of King Abdulaziz University

President of King Abdulaziz University
- In office June 2016 – October 2022
- Preceded by: Osama Tayyib
- Succeeded by: Hana Abdullah Alnuaim

Personal details
- Born: 1958 (age 67–68)
- Education: King Abdulaziz University (B.S.); King Abdulaziz University (M.S.); University of Essex (PhD)
- Scientific career
- Education: King Abdulaziz University
- Fields: Physical Chemistry
- Workplaces: King Abdulaziz University

Abdulrahman Obaid Al-Youbi (Arabic: عبد الرحمن اليوبي; born 1958) was the president of King Abdulaziz University from June 2016 to October 2022.

== Biography ==
Al-Youbi received his bachelor's and master's degree in chemistry from King Abdulaziz University. He attended the University of Essex on a scholarship, where he received his PhD in physical chemistry in 1986.

Before being appointed as president of King Abdulaziz University in 2016, he served as vice president. He was a consultant at the Ministry of Higher Education, and was dean and vice-dean of the faculty of science, at King Abdulaziz University.
