= Osama Tayyib =

President of King Abdulaziz University

- أسامه طيب

President of King Abdulaziz University
- In office 2003–2014
- Preceded by: Ghazi bin Obaid Madani
- Succeeded by: Abdulrahman Obaid Al-Youbi

Personal details
- Born: Saudi Arabia
- Education: King Saud University (BSc Pharmacy); Vanderbilt University (PhD Pharmacology)
- Occupation: Academic, University Administrator
- Known for: Former President of King Abdulaziz University

Osama Tayyib is a Saudi academic and university administrator. He served as the President of King Abdulaziz University in Jeddah for eleven years, from 2003 to 2014. Throughout his career, he has held several academic and administrative positions at various Saudi universities.

== Education ==
Tayyib earned a Bachelor of Science degree in pharmacy with honors from King Saud University in 1976. He later obtained a Ph.D. in pharmacology from Vanderbilt University in the United States in 1981.

== Administrative positions ==
Over more than three decades in higher education, Tayyib held many leadership and administrative roles, including:

- President of King Abdulaziz University (2003–2014)
- Acting Director of the Arab Open University (2003–2004)
- Acting Director of Jazan University (2005–2007)
- Acting Director of University of Tabuk (2005–2007)
- Acting Director of Northern Border University (1990–1995)
- Dean of the Faculty of Medicine at King Abdulaziz University (1995–2001)
- Acting Vice President for Graduate Studies and Research (1997–1998, and 1983–1987)
- Director of King Fahd Center for Medical Research (1983–1987)

== Memberships and committees ==
=== Scientific memberships ===
- Member of the American Society for Pharmacology and Experimental Therapeutics
- Member of the American Academy of Clinical Sciences
- Saudi Pharmaceutical Society and the Saudi Society for Medical Education

=== Administrative memberships ===
- Member of the Saudi Higher Education Council (2003–2014)
- Chairman of the International Advisory Board, King Abdulaziz University (2011–2014)
- Chairman of the Board of Directors of Wadi Jeddah Company for Technology (2012–2014)
- Member of the Supreme Commission of the Makkah Region (2012–2014)
- Member of the Makkah Region Council (2013–2014)
- Chairman of the Board of Trustees of the Scientific Endowment at King Abdulaziz University (2009–2014)
