= King Abdulaziz University =

Public university in Jeddah, Saudi Arabia

King Abdulaziz University (KAU)
- جامعة الملك عبد العزيز
- Other name: KAU
- Motto: اقْرَأْ بِاسْمِ رَبِّكَ "Read: in the Name of your Lord" (Quran 96:1)
- Type: Public research university
- Established: 1967; 59 years ago
- Endowment: US$1 billion
- President: Tareef bin Yousuf Alaama
- Administrative staff: 4,000
- Students: 117,096 (55,576 male and 61,525 female students – academic session 2022/23)
- Location: Jeddah, Makkah, Saudi Arabia; 21°29′38″N 39°15′1″E
- Campus: Both urban and rural
- Website: www.kau.edu.sa

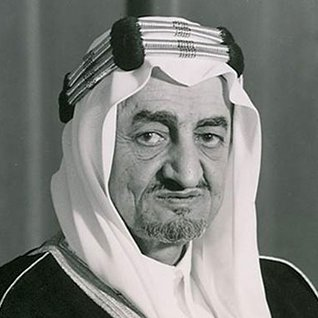
King Faisal of Saudi Arabia played a significant role in King Abdulaziz University's success.

King Abdulaziz University (KAU) (Arabic: جامعة الملك عبد العزيز) is a public research university in Jeddah, Saudi Arabia. Established in 1967 as a private university by a group of businessmen led by Muhammad Bakhashab and including author Hamza Bogary, it was named after the country's first monarch, King Abdulalziz ibn Saud. It was converted into a public university by King Faisal in 1974.

With over 117,096 students in 2022, it is the largest university in the country. Located in south Jeddah, the university is the center of teaching and research of the city, comprising 24 faculties, 15 of these are located on the campus and 9 are off-campus. The university also offers some courses that are unavailable at any other universities in Saudi Arabia, such as marine science, meteorology, and astronomy.

== History ==
=== Private university ===
In the year 1964, the idea of establishing a private university in the city of Jeddah was originally put forward by Mohammed Ali Hafiz. In the same year, a preparatory committee of 6 members was formed, including Mohamed Ali Hafiz and Muhammad Abu Bakr Bakhashab. Shortly after, then-Crown Prince Faisal officially approved the idea. In 1965, the university's executive committee was formed. In 1966, the KAU held a competition to design their logo. The winning design was submitted by Abdul-Halim Radwi, a local artist from Jeddah.

In the year 1967, King Abdulaziz University was officially established as a private university, with goals to spread higher education in the western region of Saudi Arabia. Prior to this date, there were no higher-education institutions in Jeddah. These goals were met through efforts of high-ranking businessmen and notable Saudi figures; and additionally with the help of King Faisal's encouragement and financial support. The university started its first academic year in 1968, with a relatively small number of students (68 male – 30 female). In 1969, the first faculty was established (Faculty of Economics and Administration). In 1970, the Faculty of Arts and Humanities was established. The university was named after King Abdulaziz, founder of Saudi Arabia.

=== Public university (1974–present) ===
In 1974, the Council of Ministers of Saudi Arabia decided to merge the university with the government; converting it to a public university. As of 2017, it had almost 31,000 students, of which 28% are international.

The building's construction was designed by Bangladeshi-American architect Fazlur Rahman Khan.

In 2018, it was ranked the 1st Arab university by Times Higher Education due to very strong citation impact and highly international outlook. It also ranked no. 1 in percentage of total publications with international collaboration, according to US News rankings.

== Research programs ==
Between 2004 and 2014, King Abdulaziz University enacted a program to attract the international community and has welcomed nearly 150 researches of various disciplines. The university has developed international research partners, including in Morocco where it has developed a joint lunar research program with the Astronomic Observatory of Oukaïmeden. The university has 13 different research centers, predominantly in the fields of medicine (medical genomes and osteoperosis), environment and energy, climate change, and desalination.

Founded in the 1970s by Sami Angawi, the research center on pilgrimage to Mecca (Hajj Research Center) conducts a series of works around the religious event, notably on the aspects of logistics surrounding the pilgrimage.

== Faculties ==
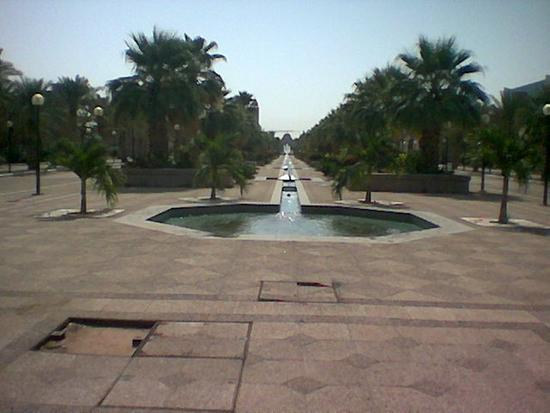
University yard

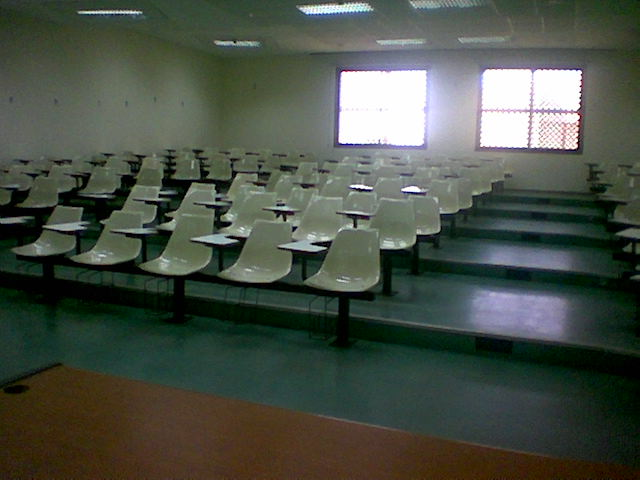
Empty classrooms

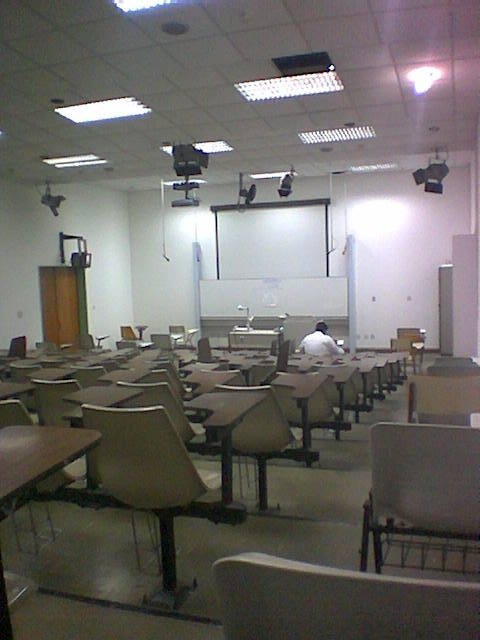
Classroom with TV cameras, for remote teaching

=== Faculty of Engineering ===
- Electrical Engineering
- Computer Engineering
- Biomedical & Electrical Engineering
- Nuclear Engineering
- Aeronautical Engineering
- Chemical & Materials Engineering
- Civil Engineering
- Electrical & Computer Engineering
- Industrial Engineering
- Mining Engineering
- Production Engineering and Mechanical Systems Design
- Thermal Engineering and Desalination Technology

These programs are accredited by ABET as Substantially Equivalent Programs since 2003.

=== Faculty of Economics and Administration ===
The Faculty of Economics and Administration was the first college to be established in King Abdulaziz University, and until this day it is called "The Base of Founder's University," referring to the founder of the country.

- Department of Business Administration
- Department of Finance
- Department of Marketing
- Department of Human Resource Management
- Department of Accounting
- Department of Management Information Systems
- Department of Political Science
- Department of Health Administration
- Department of Public Administration
- Department of Economics
- Department of Law (defunct in 2012; separated into a new faculty)

In 2015, FEA received its fourth international accreditation, the AACSB making it one of the top business colleges in the middle east and across the world.

=== Faculty of Law ===
The Faculty of Law was established in 2012 as it segregated from Faculty of Economics and Administration.

- Public Law
- Private Law

=== Other faculties ===
- Faculty of Applied Medical Sciences
- Faculty of Medicine
- Faculty of Medicine at Rabigh
- Faculty of Arts and Humanities
- Faculty of Business
- Faculty of Education
- Faculty of Communication and Media
- Faculty of Computing and Information Technology
- Faculty of Design
- Faculty of Meteorology, Environment and Arid Land Agriculture
- Faculty of Nursing
- Faculty of Science
- Faculty of Pharmacy
- Faculty of Dentistry
- Faculty of Earth Sciences
- Faculty of Health Sciences
- Faculty of Environmental Designs
- Faculty of Home Economics
- Faculty of Marine Sciences
- Faculty of Tourism
- Faculty of Maritime Studies
- Faculty of Architecture and Planning

== Ranking ==
University rankings

Global – Overall
- ARWU World: 151–200 (2023)
- QS World: 163 (2026)
- THE World: 251–300 (2024)
- USNWR Global: =65 (2023)

Regional – Overall
- QS Arab region: 5 (2024)
- USNWR Arab countries: 1 (2020)

King Abdulaziz University is ranked between 101 and 150 since 2020 by Academic Ranking of World Universities. Furthermore, according to U.S. News & World Report Best Global University Ranking, King Abdulaziz University is ranked 44 in 2022. And according to QS World University Rankings, King Abdulaziz University is ranked at number 143 in 2021 in the world's top universities ranking by the London-based Quacquarelli Symonds (QS).

KAU has faced criticism for allegedly paying highly cited researchers from around the world to cite KAU as a "secondary academic affiliation" in order to boost their rankings. It also faced criticism for its high ranking by Times of Higher Education.

== Former university directors ==
- Prof. Ahmed Mohammed Ali Al-Madani (1 January 1967 – 1 August 1972)
- Prof. Muhammad bin Abduh Yamani (26 August 1973 – 6 September 1975)
- Prof. Muhammad bin Omar Zubair (15 June 1976 – 7 December 1979)
- Prof. Abdullah Omar Nasseef (19 February 1980 – 3 November 1983)
- Prof. Reda bin Mohammed Saeed Obeid (19 January 1984 – 8 December 1993)
- Prof. Ossama bin Abdul Majed Shobokshi (3 April 1994 – 8 December 1995)
- Prof. Ghazi bin Obeid Madani (9 December 1995 – 8 May 2003)
- Prof. Osama Tayyib (2003–2016)
- Prof. Abdulrahman Obaid Al-Youbi (2016–2023)
- Prof. Hana Abdullah Al-Nuaim (acting, 2023 – 2024)
- Dr. Tareef bin Yousuf Alaama (2024 – present)

== Notable alumni ==
- Hanan Balkhy, Director of WHO Regional Office for the Eastern Mediterranean
- Mishal Musfir Al Sayyali, Director of Health Affairs in Jeddah Governorate.
- Tareef Yousuf Alaama, President of King Abdulaziz University.
- Sattam Saud Linjawi, Board Member and CEO of Wadi Jeddah.
- Fayad Asaad Al Dandashi, CEO of Tamer Group.
- Ayman Samih Al Khadra, Acting CEO of Dr. Sulaiman Al Habib Medical Group.
- Abdulaziz Abdulbaqi, Assistant Deputy Minister for Planning & Organizational Excellence, Ministry of Health, Kingdom of Saudi Arabia.
- Ali Hassan Bakheet, Assistant Deputy Minister for Spatial Development, Ministry of Municipal, Rural Affairs and Housing, Kingdom of Saudi Arabia.
- Hani Abdulaziz Jokhdar, Deputy Minister for Public Health, Ministry of Health, Kingdom of Saudi Arabia.
- Jameel Talal Abualenian, General Executive Director of The National Health Emergency Operation Center, Ministry of Health, Kingdom of Saudi Arabia
- Arwa Yousuf Alaama, Vice President of Education and Advancement, KAUST, Kingdom of Saudi Arabia.
- Anas Saleh Serafi, CEO of AlSalehat Holding Company.
- Khaled Abed Qama, Chairman of the Board of Directors, Saudi Enaya.
- Mohammad Abu Al Khair Ismail, CEO of Pilgrims Experience Program.
- Mazen Soliman Fakeeh, President of Fakeeh Care Group.
- Wael Hamza Mutair, Director General of the Ministry of Health Branch in Makkah Al-Mukarramah, Kingdom of Saudi Arabia.
- Bandar Abdulmohsen Al Knawy, President, King Saud Bin Abdulaziz University for Health Sciences, CEO of National Guard Health Affairs, Kingdom of Saudi Arabia.
- Heba Elsewedy, humanitarian, English literature (BA, 1994)

== See also ==
- List of universities in Saudi Arabia
- Imam Muhammad ibn Saud Islamic University
- Islamic University of Madinah
- King Saud University
- Umm al-Qura University
