= Hamza Bogary =

Hamza Mohammad Bogary or Boqari (Arabic: حمزة محمد بوقري) (1932–1984) was an Arabic author from Mecca who also worked in broadcasting, becoming Director General of Broadcasting; from 1965 to 1967, he served as Saudi Arabia's Deputy Minister of Information. In 1967, he became a cofounder of King Abdulaziz University in Jeddah. Of his writings, the best known outside of Arabia is his "lightly fictionalized memoir" Saqifat al-Safa (Arabic: سقيفة الصفا), translated into English as The Sheltered Quarter: "His descriptions of school and family life resemble closely what we know of a male student's rounds in eighteenth-century Mecca. The book is a Meccan bildungsroman, calling up those final days before the oil boom that transformed Saudi Arabia and the Hajj."

== Bibliography ==
- Bogary, Hamza. The Sheltered Quarter, trans. Olive Kenny and Jeremy Reed, University of Texas Press, 1991: ISBN 978-0-292-72752-6.
