= Heba Elsewedy =

Egyptian humanitarian

Heba Elsewedy (born 22 September 1973) (Arabic: هبة السويدي) is an Egyptian humanitarian who is a prominent figure in the public life of Egypt. In 2013 she Founded the Ahl Masr Foundation (People Of Egypt), a non-governmental organization that provides specialized care for burn victims, including treatment and prevention. She was presented with the Mother Teresa Memorial Award for Social Justice in 2025 for her entrepreneurial work.

== Education ==
Elsewedy was raised between Saudi Arabia and Egypt. She received her B.A. degree in English literature from King Abdul Aziz University of Saudi in 1994. In 2016, she was awarded an honorary doctorate from Cape Breton University in Canada in recognition of her humanitarian contributions.

== Career highlights ==
Heba started her entrepreneurship journey with the Arabian French Textiles Company. She's a major shareholder in her family business Helal Elsewedy-Energya group, which offers a diverse number of products and services in the Egyptian market including manufacturing, retail and education.

Heba started her work in 2011, treating the wounded in Tahrir Square during the Arab Spring, she ended up caring for 4000 burn victims across Egypt. In 2016 the Ahl Masr Foundation constructed the Ahl Masr Hospital in Cairo, which is the first Hospital specializing in burn treatment in North Africa and The Middle East.

In an interview she stated that burn injuries are often overlooked despite their prevalence and danger, this is the reason she said that she focused her humanitarian work on helping burn victims.

The Ahl Masr Foundation has treated thousands of burn patients across Egypt. In collaboration with the World Health Organization, the foundation has also contributed to developing standardized protocols for burn treatment in Egypt. The organization additionally operates an integration center that supports burn survivors in reintegrating into society following treatment.

Elsewedy and her foundation also provided assistance to burn and trauma victims in Libya during the 2013 conflict.

== Recognition ==
In 2025 the Indian organization Harmony Foundation presented Elsewedy with the Mother Teresa Memorial Award for Social Justice which honors those who demonstrate humanitarian values that are constant with famous Catholic missionary Mother Teresa.

In her acceptance speech, she emphasized the marginalization of burn victims, stating:

“This award recognizes a long-neglected cause. For decades, burn patients and survivors of these traumas have remained invisible, particularly in my country, Egypt, as well as in the Middle East and Africa. This recognition confirms that their suffering matters and that their healing deserves dignity, care and hope.”
