= Hanan H. Balkhy =

Saudi physician

Hanan Balkhy
- Education: King Abdulaziz University
- Occupation: Physician

Hanan H. Balkhy is a Saudi physician who currently serves as WHO Regional Director for the Eastern Mediterranean.

== Early life and education ==
Balkhy grew up in the United States of America until six years of age. She graduated from King Abdulaziz University in Jeddah, Saudi Arabia in 1991.

Balkhy did her pediatric residency at Massachusetts General Hospital in Boston between 1993 and 1996. She also received a fellowship in pediatric infectious diseases from the Joint Pediatric Infectious Disease Program of Cleveland Clinic and Rainbow Babies & Children's Hospital from 1996 to 1999. During her fellowship, she worked on the immunological response of Salmonella endotoxin in mice models under the mentorship of Professor Frederick Heinzel. She worked as the Executive Director, Infection Prevention and Control at the Ministry of National Guard for 10 years.

== Work ==
Balkhy was the leader of the infectious diseases research department at King Abdullah International Research Centre at King Saud bin Abdulaziz University for Health Sciences in Riyadh, Saudi Arabia. She was the editor-in-chief of the Journal of Infection and Public Health from 2009 to 2019, and has over 200 publications.

Dr Hanan Balkhy was appointed WHO Regional Director for the Eastern Mediterranean by the WHO Executive Board in January 2024. She took office on 1 February 2024.

== See also ==
- Google Scholar Profile of Hanan H. Balkhy
