= Girl Guides of Saudi Arabia =

National Guiding organization of Saudi Arabia

- Country: Saudi Arabia
- Affiliation: World Association of Girl Guides and Girl Scouts (unclear)
- Website http://www.saudigirlguides.com/en/home.aspx

The Girl Guides of Saudi Arabia is the national Guiding organization of Saudi Arabia, however work towards World Association of Girl Guides and Girl Scouts membership recognition remains unclear.

== See also ==
- Saudi Arabian Boy Scouts Association
