= Tareef bin Yousuf Alaama =

President of King Abdulaziz University

President of King Abdulaziz University
- In office February 2024 – till now
- Preceded by: Hana Abdullah Alnuaim

Personal details
- Children: 4
- Education: Western University, Ontario, Canada: Consultant physician and fellow in Memory Disorders and Osteoporosis.: King Abdulaziz University (B.S.)
- Scientific career
- Education: King Abdulaziz University
- Fields: Bachelor of Medicine, Bachelor of Surgery
- Institutions: King Abdulaziz University

Tareef bin Yousuf Alaama became president of King Abdulaziz University in February 2024. Prior to that, he served as the Deputy Minister of Health for Therapeutic Services in Saudi Arabia.

He is a Fellow of the Royal College of Physicians of Canada, a Fellow of the American College of Physicians, and a Certified Physician Executive. Alaama holds a Bachelor of Medicine and Surgery from King Abdulaziz University.

His clinical specialties include internal medicine and geriatrics, with additional professional certifications related to neurological care and elderly rehabilitation obtained in Canada and the United States.

Tareef also pursued executive leadership training at prestigious institutions including London Business School, Harvard Business School, and the Ross School of Business at the University of Michigan.

== Career ==
=== Academic leadership ===
As Deputy Minister of Health for Therapeutic Services (2014), Alaama was responsible for a broad portfolio of healthcare functions. He also led national-level quality improvement programs, including initiatives related to blood bank management, emergency care, and maternal-child health.

Alaama has served in advisory roles across various Saudi hospitals and has held board memberships in institutions such as the Saudi Red Crescent Authority and the Western Region Health Council.

=== Research and publications ===
Alaama has contributed to research in geriatric medicine, hospital preparedness, and critical care. Several of his academic contributions are archived on platforms such as ResearchGate.

== Honors and awards ==
- King Abdulaziz Medal – Second Class (2021): Awarded for distinguished service in healthcare and leadership.
- Kaufman Canadian Award (2009): For outstanding research in geriatric medicine.

== Professional leadership training ==
In 2018, Alaama completed the Senior Executive Leadership Program at the London Business School. He also took part in the Healthcare Delivery Strategy program at Harvard Business School in 2022. In 2020, he earned Physician Executive certification from the American Association for Physician Leadership, and in the same year, he received a Six Sigma Black Belt in process improvement.
