= Ossama bin Abdul Majed Shobokshi =

Saudi Arabian politician (1943–2023)

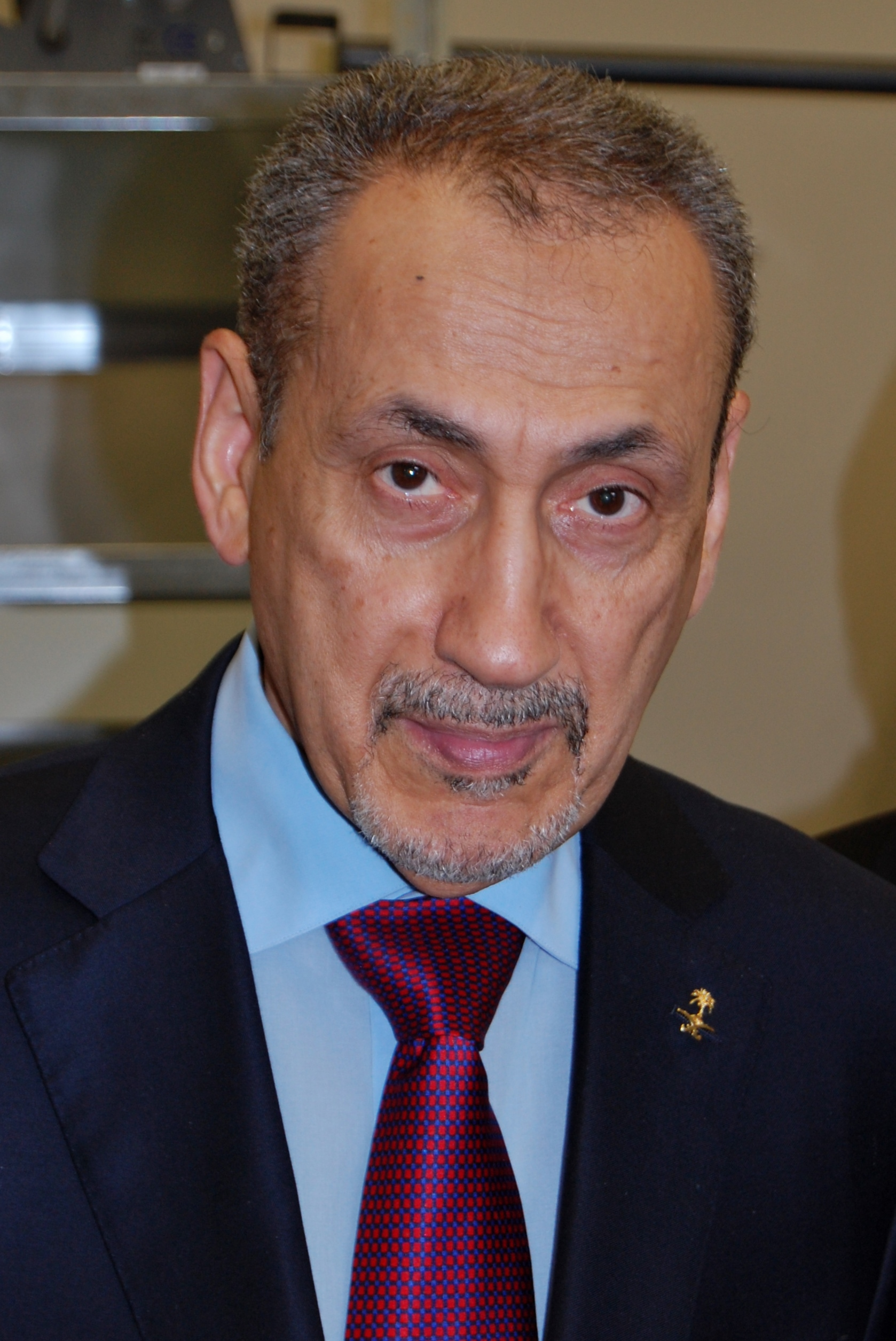
Ossama bin Abdul Majed Shobokshi

Ossama bin Abdul Majed Shobokshi (Arabic: أسامة بن عبد المجيد شبكشي; 21 October 1943 – 31 March 2023) was a Saudi Arabian academic, physician, diplomat and politician.

== Biography ==
Shobokshi was born in Jeddah in 1943. He held a PhD in internal medicine from the University of Erlangen, Germany, in 1976. He worked as the dean of the medicine faculty at various Saudi Arabian universities. He served as the president of King Abdulaziz University in Jeddah.

He was the minister of health from 1995 to 2003. After serving as an advisor to King Fahd, Shobokshi was appointed ambassador of Saudi Arabia in 2004. Shobokshi's tenure ended in 2015.

Shobokshi was an honorary fellow of the Irish Royal College of Surgeons. He was a founding member and a board member of the German-Arab Friendship Society. He died in Jeddah on 31 March 2023.
