= Sami Angawi =

Saudi architect

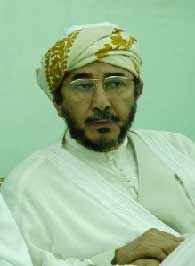
- Sami Angawi
- Occupation: Architect

Sami Angawi is a Saudi architect. He studied architecture in the United Kingdom and the United States.

== Early life ==
Dr. Sami Angawi has a Doctor of Philosophy in Islamic Architecture from the School of Oriental and African Studies, University of London, UK. Since 1988, he has been the founder and general director of the Amar Center for Architectural Heritage in Jeddah. In 2011, he founded the Al-Makkiyah Al-Madaniyah Intercultural Institute. In 2013, Dr. Angawi co-founded makmad.org e.V., a German non-profit organization headquartered in Hannover.

== Architectural style ==
Angawi's architectural designs assert the importance of his Hijazi heritage with the common cultural heritage shared by both western and Islamic societies; believing that a "clash of civilizations" need not lead to misunderstanding, but rather friendship, trust and peace.

Angawi developed the concept of balance, known in Arabic as mizan, which is the essence of Islamic tradition and of many of the world's religious beliefs. The aspiration of Angawi to reflect this historic principle in his life and work is important. It has made him a leader in building bridges between the Middle East and the rest of the world. "More balance can be achieved through respect for the past," Angawi said in his personal blog by adding, "In our Al Makkiyah mansion, modernity and tradition, privacy and openness, stability and dynamism are equally represented to generate harmony."
