= Abdullah Omar Nasseef =

Saudi chemist and geologist (1939–2025)

- عبد الله عمر نصيف
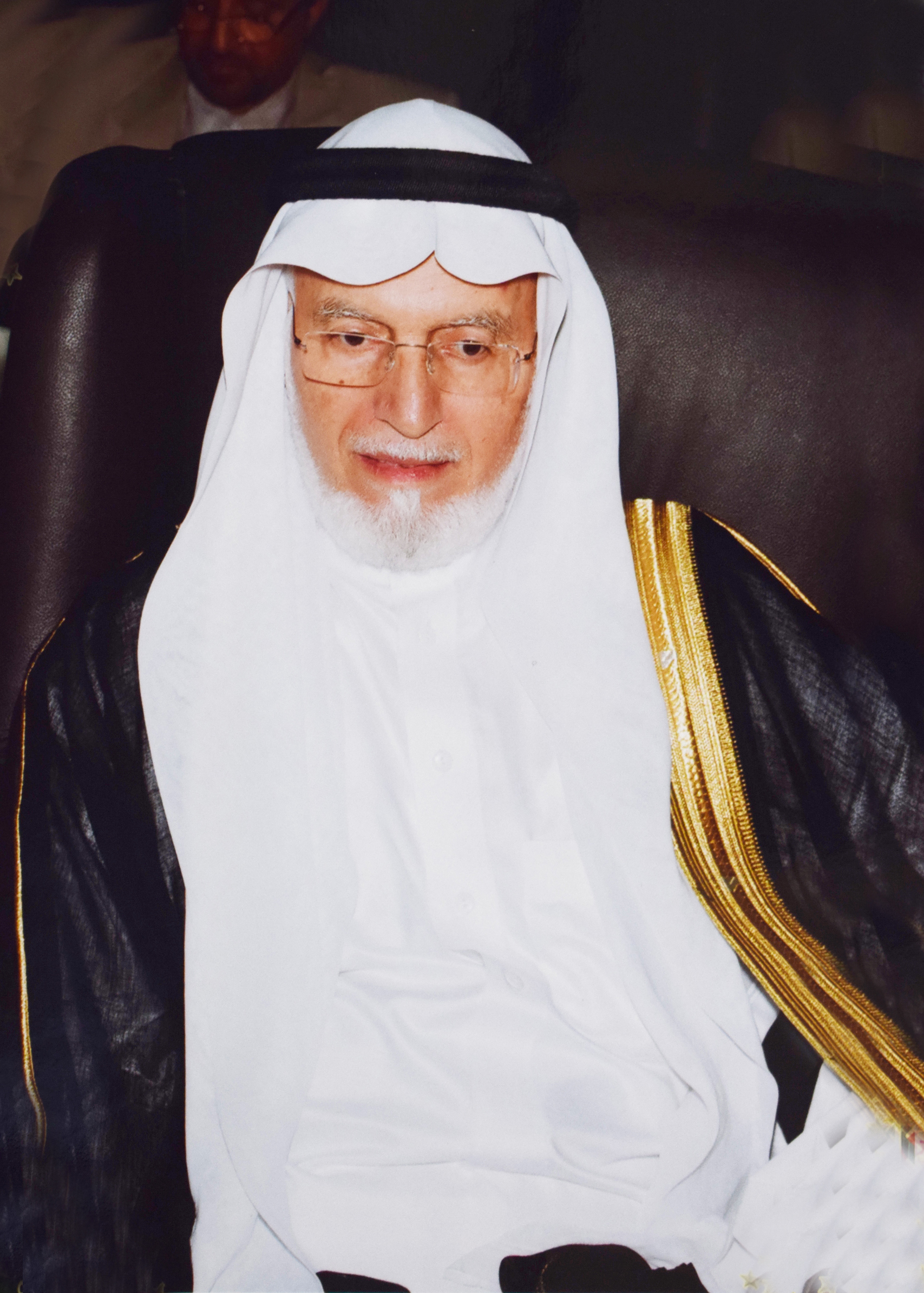
- Nasseef in 2011
- Born: 5 July 1939; Jeddah, Saudi Arabia
- Died: 12 October 2025 (aged 86)
- Occupations: Chemist and geologist

Abdullah Omar Nasseef (Arabic: عبد الله بن عمر نصيف; 5 July 1939 – 12 October 2025) was a Saudi chemist and geologist. He served as Chief Scout of the Saudi Arabian Boy Scouts Association, which he joined in 1956.

== Early life and education ==
Nasseef was born in Jeddah on 5 July 1939. He had a PhD degree from Leeds University in the United Kingdom.

== Career ==
Nasseef was a professor at King Abdulaziz University in Jeddah. He was chairman of the World Muslim Congress, chairman of the founding board of Sahm Al-Nour Trust, and Secretary General of Muslim World League from 1983 to 1993. He served as vice-president of the Consultative Assembly of Saudi Arabia, President of King Abdul Aziz University, and Secretary-General of the International Islamic Council for Da'wah and Relief (IICDR).

== Death ==
Nasseef died on 12 October 2025, at the age of 86.

== Awards and recognitions ==
In 1983 Nasseef was awarded the Bronze Wolf, the only distinction of the World Organization of the Scout Movement, awarded by the World Scout Committee for exceptional services to world Scouting.

Dr. Naseef was also awarded with the King Faisal Prize for Service to Islam in 1991 and the King Abdulaziz Medal of the First Class in 2004.
