= WHO Regional Office for the Eastern Mediterranean =

World Health Organization (WHO) regional office

WHO Regional Office for the Eastern Mediterranean مكتب منظمة الصحة العالمية لشرق المتوسط

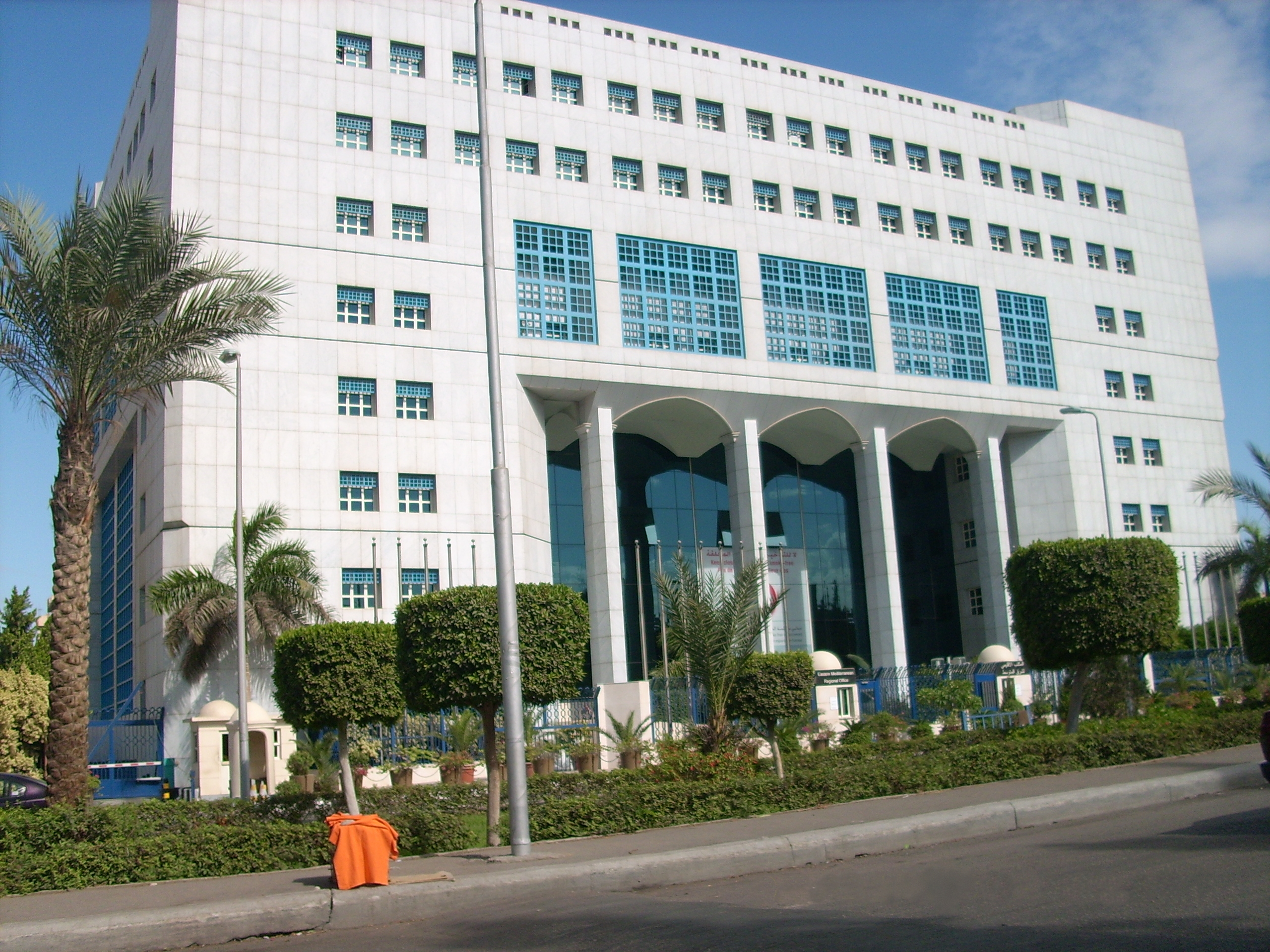
- WHO Regional Office for the Eastern Mediterranean, Nasr City, Cairo
- Formation: between 1948 and 1952
- Type: Regional office of the World Health Organization
- Legal status: Active
- Location: Cairo, Egypt
- Coordinates: 30°3′49″N 31°20′50″E
- Head: Hanan H. Balkhy
- Publication: Eastern Mediterranean Health Journal
- Parent organization: World Health Organization (WHO)
- Website: www.emro.who.int

The WHO Regional Office for the Eastern Mediterranean is the regional office of the World Health Organization that serves 22 countries and territories in West Asia, North Africa, the Horn of Africa and Central Asia. It is one of WHO's six regional offices around the world.

== History ==
All the regional divisions of WHO were created between 1949 and 1952. They are based on article 44 of WHO's constitution, which allows WHO to "establish a [single] regional organization to meet the special needs of [each defined] area". Many decisions are made at regional level, including importance discussions over WHO's budget, and in deciding the members of the next assembly, which are designated by the regions.

== Members ==
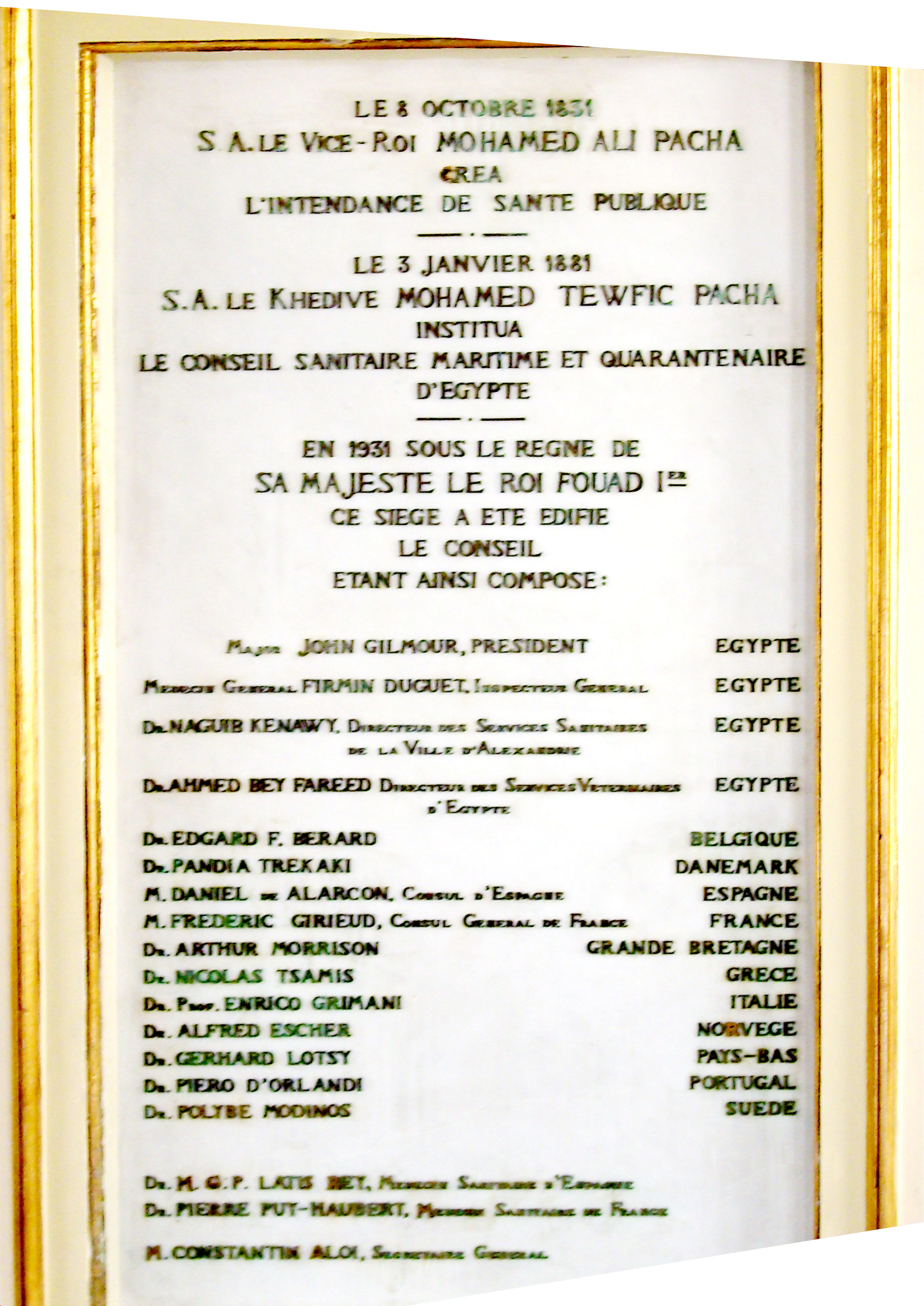
Alexandria former WHO Regional Office for the Eastern Mediterranean building, Sanitary council establishment marble plate 1831

The WHO Regional Office for the Eastern Mediterranean aims to work with local governments, specialized agencies, partners and other stakeholders in the field of public health to develop health policies and strengthen national health systems.

It serves the WHO Eastern Mediterranean Region, which includes 21 member states in West Asia, North Africa, the Horn of Africa and Central Asia, as well as the occupied Palestinian territory (West Bank and Gaza Strip). The office covers an area of nearly 583 million people. The countries and territories in the WHO Eastern Mediterranean Region are:

- Afghanistan
- Bahrain
- Djibouti
- Egypt
- Iran
- Iraq
- Jordan
- Kuwait
- Lebanon
- Libya
- Morocco
- Oman
- Pakistan
- State of Palestine
- Qatar
- Saudi Arabia
- Somalia
- Sudan
- Syrian Arab Republic
- Tunisia
- United Arab Emirates
- Yemen

== Location ==
The WHO Regional Office for the Eastern Mediterranean was originally based in Alexandria, Egypt. It was later moved to its new location in Nasr City, Cairo.

== Languages ==
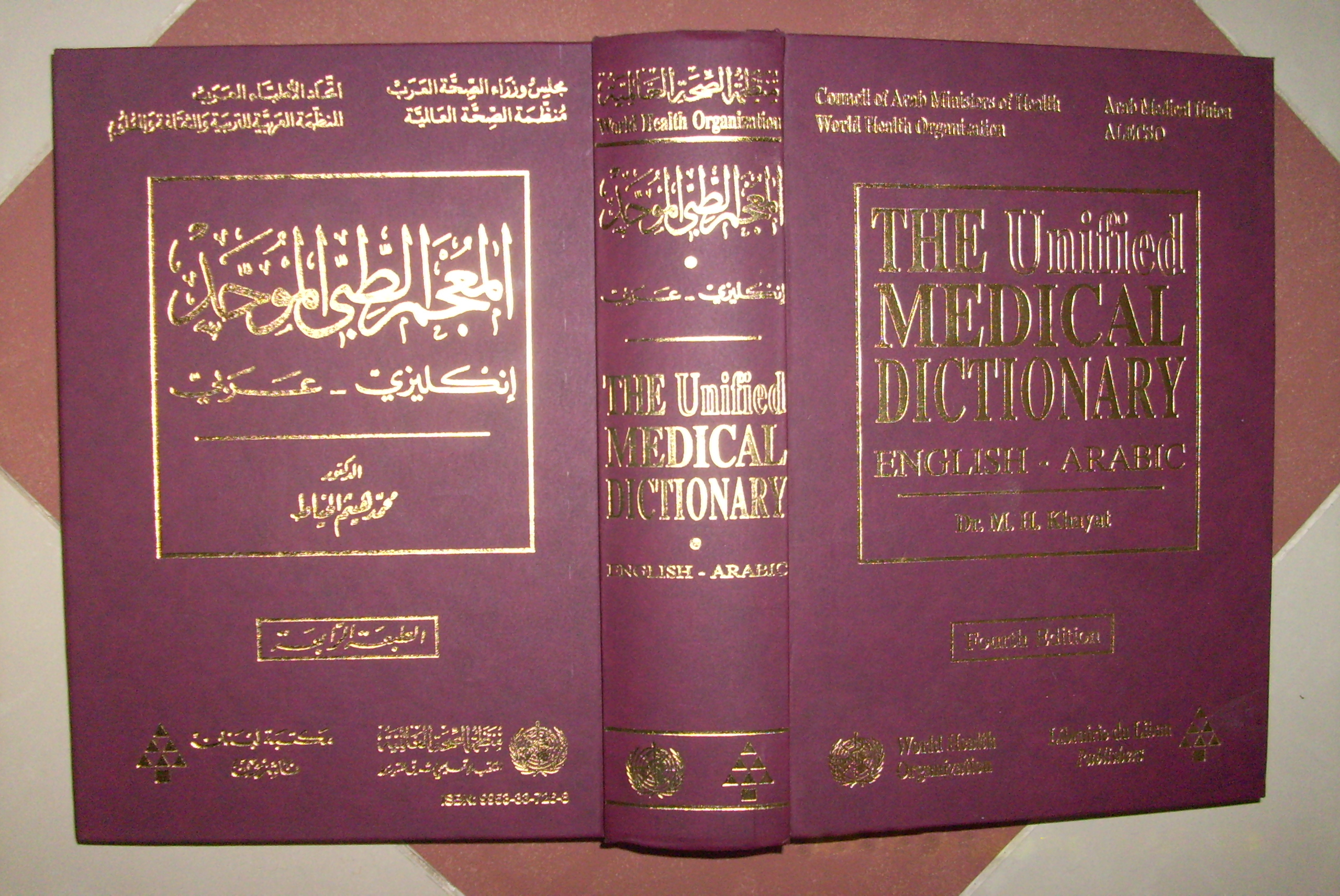
Unified Medical Dictionary, EMRO المعجم الطبي الموحد

The official languages of WHO in the Eastern Mediterranean Region are Arabic, English and French. However, other national languages such as Persian, Urdu, Dari, Pashto and Somali are also used in communicating health messages and delivering health programs.

== Services ==
- Unified Arabic–English–French Medical Dictionary to help advance of Medicine and health related sciences in Arabic countries. An online version with a search engine is available.
- Eastern Mediterranean Health Journal
