= Saudi Arabian Boy Scouts Association =

National Scouting organization of Saudi Arabia

- جمعية الكشافة العربية السعودية
- Country: Saudi Arabia
- Founded: 1961
- Membership: 19,269
- Chief Scout: Abdullah Omar Nasseef
- Minister of Education, who is also the president of the Saudi Arabian Boy Scouts Association: Dr. Abdullah Al Obaid
- Affiliation: World Organization of the Scout Movement
- Website http://www.scouts.org.sa/a/

The Saudi Arabian Boy Scouts Association (SABSA, Arabic: جمعية الكشافة العربية السعودية) is the national Scouting organization of Saudi Arabia. Scouting was officially founded in Saudi Arabia in 1961, though Scouting was active many years prior to the founding date, and became a member of the World Organization of the Scout Movement in 1963. It has 19,269 members (as of 2010).

The Association seeks to spread Scouting throughout the Kingdom of Saudi Arabia with the aim of promoting the Scout ideals of courage, self-reliance and brotherhood.

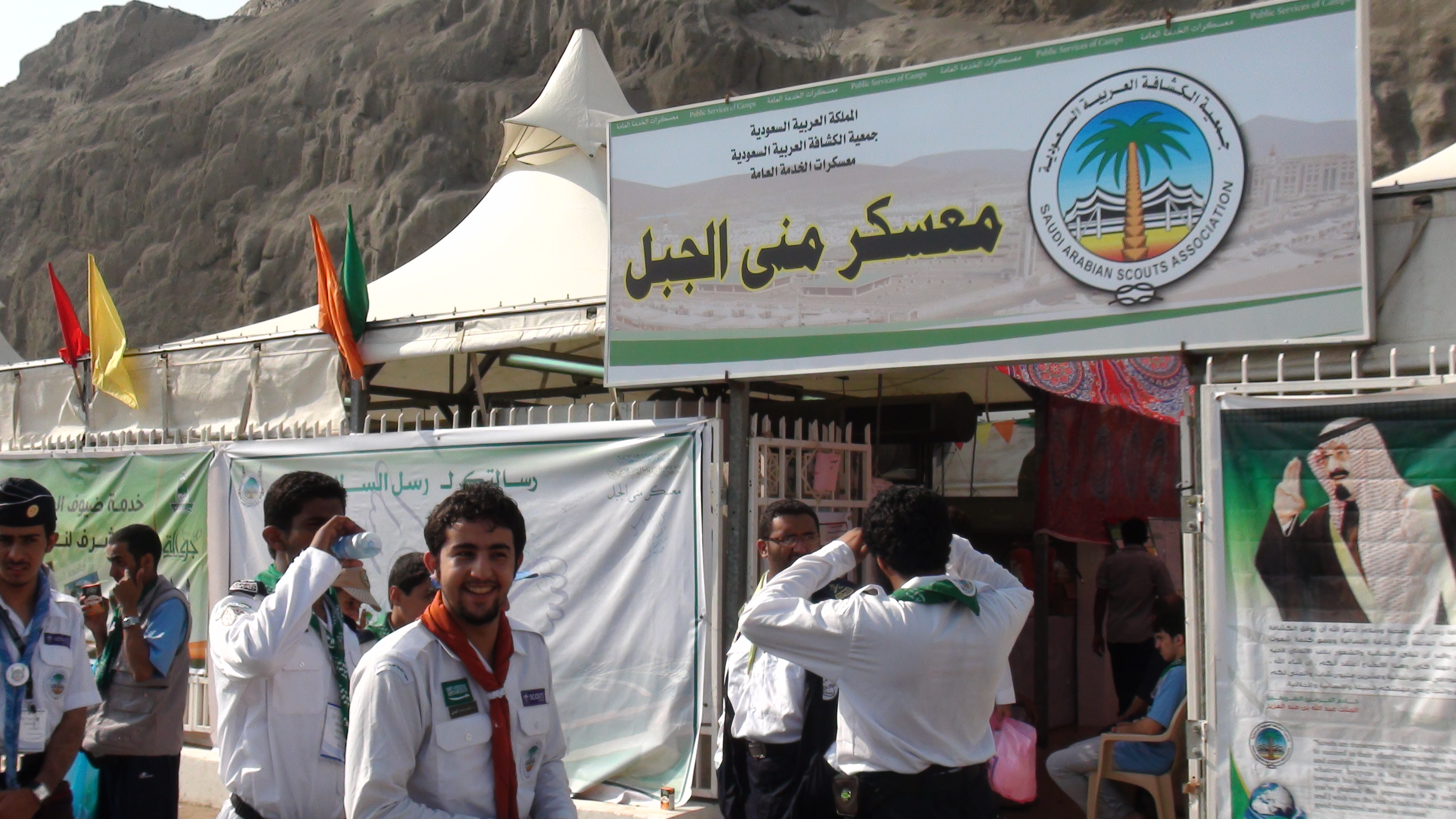
Scouting in Mina area, Saudi Arabia

The Association participates in most regional and international Scouting activities. They contribute financial assistance generously to help Scouting in less fortunate countries.

In 1983, Dr. Abdullah O. Nasseef was awarded the Bronze Wolf, the only distinction of the World Organization of the Scout Movement, awarded by the World Scout Committee for exceptional services to world Scouting.

The Scout Motto is Kun Musta'idan or كن مستعدا, translating as "Be Prepared" in Arabic. The noun for a single Scout is Kashaf or كشاف in Arabic.

== Emblem ==
The Scout emblem of the Saudi Arabian Boy Scouts Association incorporates a palm tree on a backdrop of a traditional Bedouin marquee tent or bayt.
