= Buruli ulcer =

Infectious tropical disease

- Other names: Bairnsdale ulcer, Daintree ulcer, Mossman ulcer, Kumasi ulcer, Searls ulcer
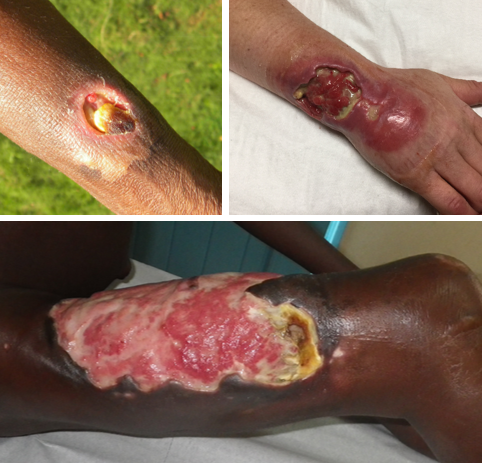
- Buruli ulcer lesions. Top-left, an early ulcer. Top-right, a larger ulcer across the lower arm and wrist. Bottom, a large ulcer on the thigh.
- Pronunciation: /bəˈruːli/
- Specialty: Infectious disease
- Symptoms: Area of swelling that becomes an ulcer
- Causes: Mycobacterium ulcerans
- Treatment: Rifampicin and clarithromycin
- Frequency: 1,862 cases reported to WHO in 2024

Buruli ulcer is an infectious disease characterized by the development of painless open wounds. The disease is limited to certain areas of the world, with most cases occurring in Sub-Saharan Africa and Australia. The first sign of infection is a small painless nodule or area of swelling, typically on the arms or legs. The nodule grows larger over days to weeks, eventually forming an open ulcer. Deep ulcers can cause scarring of muscles and tendons, resulting in permanent disability.

It is caused by skin infection with bacteria called Mycobacterium ulcerans. The mechanism by which M. ulcerans is transmitted from the environment to humans is not known but may involve the bite of an aquatic insect or the infection of open wounds. Once in the skin, M. ulcerans grows and releases the toxin mycolactone, which blocks the normal function of cells, resulting in tissue death and immune suppression at the site of the ulcer.

The World Health Organization (WHO) recommends treating with a combination of the antibiotics rifampicin and clarithromycin. With antibiotic administration and proper wound care, small ulcers typically heal within six months. Deep ulcers and those on sensitive body sites may require surgery to remove dead tissue or repair scarred muscles or joints. Even with proper treatment, Buruli ulcers can take months to heal. Regular cleaning and dressing of wounds aid healing and prevent secondary infections.

In 2026, WHO received 1,862 reports of Buruli ulcer globally. It typically occurs in rural areas near slow-moving or stagnant water. The first written description of the disease is credited to Albert Ruskin Cook in 1897 at Mengo Hospital in Uganda. Fifty years later, the causative bacterium was isolated and identified by a group at the Alfred Hospital in Melbourne. In 1998, WHO established the Global Buruli Ulcer Initiative to coordinate global efforts to eliminate Buruli ulcer. WHO considers it a neglected tropical disease.

== Signs and symptoms ==
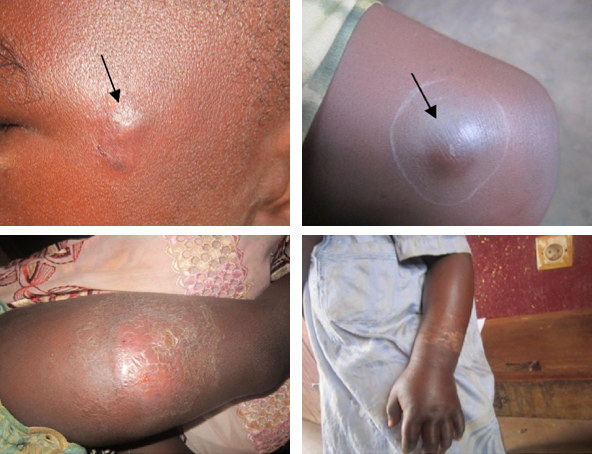
Early signs of Buruli ulcer in Cameroon. Top, painless swollen bumps. Bottom-left, a "plaque". Bottom-right, widespread swelling of the lower arm.

The first sign of Buruli ulcer is a painless swollen bump on the arm or leg, often similar in appearance to an insect bite. Sometimes the swollen area instead appears as a patch of firm, raised skin about three centimeters across called a "plaque"; or a more widespread swelling under the skin.

Over a few weeks, the original swollen area expands to form an irregularly shaped patch of raised skin. After about four weeks, the affected skin sloughs off leaving a painless ulcer. Buruli ulcers typically have "undermined edges", the ulcer being a few centimeters wider underneath the skin than the wound itself.

In some people, the ulcer may heal on its own or remain small but linger unhealed for years. In others, it continues to grow wider and sometimes deeper, with the skin at the margin dying and sloughing off. Large ulcers may extend deep into underlying tissue, causing bone infection and exposing muscle, tendon, and bone to the air. When ulcers extend into muscles and tendons, parts of these tissues can be replaced by scar tissue, immobilizing the body part and resulting in permanent disability. Exposed ulcers can be infected by other bacteria, causing the wound to become red, painful, and foul smelling. Symptoms are typically limited to those caused by the wound; the disease rarely affects other parts of the body.

Buruli ulcers can appear anywhere on the body but are typically on the limbs. Ulcers are most common on the lower limbs (roughly 62% of ulcers globally) and upper limbs (24%), but can also be found on the trunk (9%), head or neck (3%), or genitals (less than 1%).

The World Health Organization classifies Buruli ulcer into three categories depending on the severity of its symptoms. Category I describes a single small ulcer that is less than 5 centimetres (2.0 inches). Category II describes a larger ulcer, up to 15 centimetres (5.9 in), as well as plaques and broader swollen areas that have not yet opened into ulcers. Category III is for an ulcer larger than 15 centimeters, multiple ulcers, or ulcers that have spread to include particularly sensitive sites such as the eyes, bones, joints, or genitals.

== Cause ==
Buruli ulcer is caused by infection of the skin with the bacterium Mycobacterium ulcerans. M. ulcerans is a mycobacterium, closely related to Mycobacterium marinum which infects aquatic animals and, rarely, humans. It is more distantly related to other slow-growing mycobacteria that infect humans, such as Mycobacterium tuberculosis, which causes tuberculosis, and Mycobacterium leprae, which causes leprosy. Buruli ulcer typically occurs near slow-moving or stagnant bodies of water, where M. ulcerans is found in aquatic insects, mollusks, fish, and the water itself. How M. ulcerans is transmitted to humans remains unclear, but somehow bacteria enter the skin and begin to grow. Ulceration is primarily caused by the bacterial toxin mycolactone. As the bacteria grow, they release mycolactone into the surrounding tissue. Mycolactone diffuses into host cells and blocks the action of Sec61, the molecular channel that serves as a gateway to the endoplasmic reticulum. When Sec61 is blocked, proteins that would normally enter the endoplasmic reticulum are mistargeted to the cytosol, causing a pathological stress response that leads to cell death by apoptosis. This results in tissue death at the site of infection, causing the open ulcer characteristic of the disease. At the same time, Sec61 inhibition prevents cells from signaling to activate the immune system, leaving ulcers largely free of immune cells. Immune cells that do reach the ulcer are killed by mycolactone, and tissue examinations of the ulcer show a core of growing bacteria surrounded by debris from dead and dying neutrophils (the most common immune cell).

=== Transmission ===
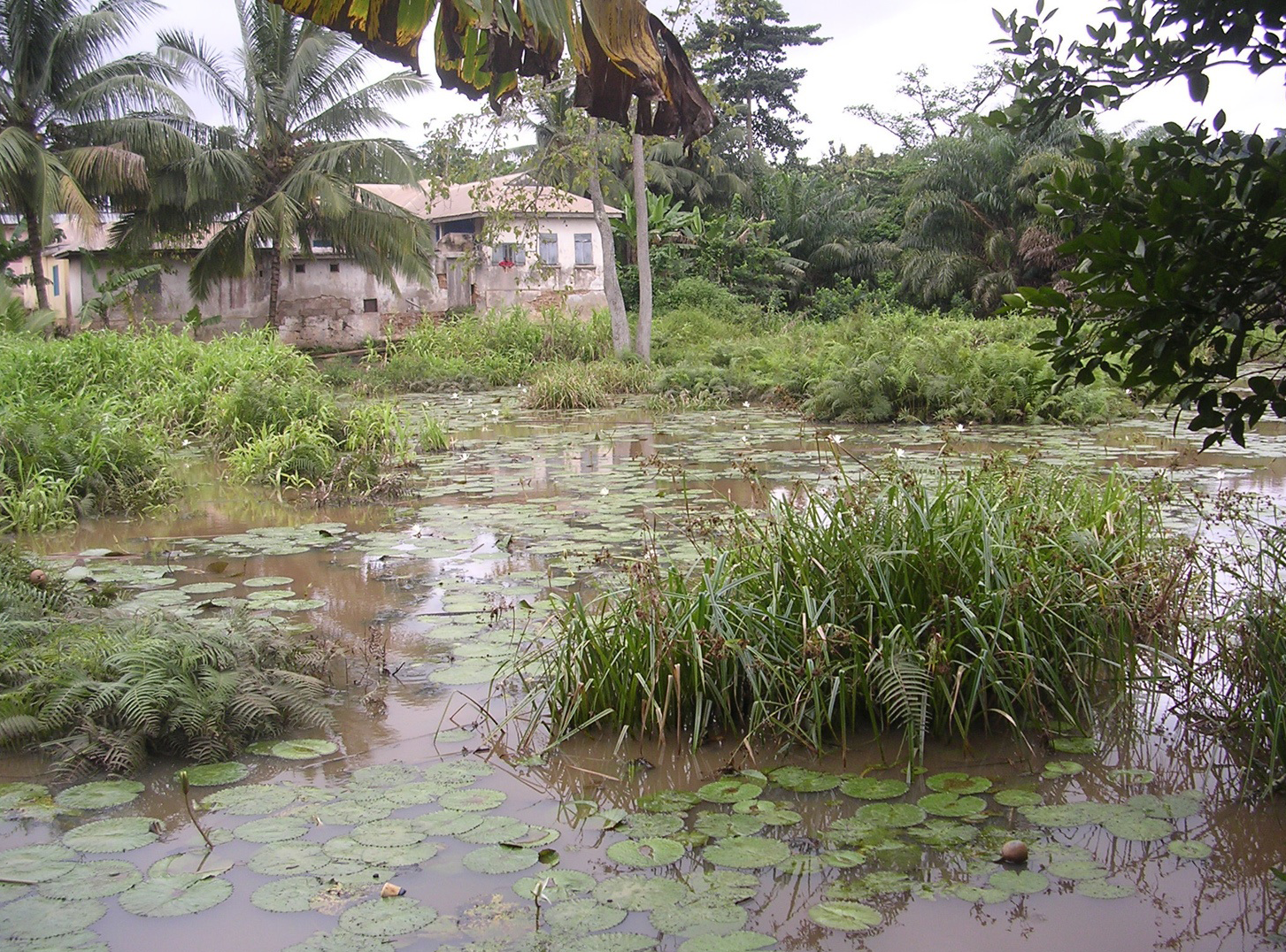
A riverine site in Ghana endemic for Buruli ulcer

It was not known how M. ulcerans was introduced to humans, although research in Australia indicates possums as a vector along with mosquitoes to be the cause. Buruli ulcer does not spread from one person to another. In areas endemic for Buruli ulcer, disease occurs near stagnant bodies of water, leading to the long-standing hypothesis that M. ulcerans is somehow transmitted to humans from aquatic environments. M. ulcerans is widespread in these environments, where it can survive as free-living or in association with other aquatic organisms. Live M. ulcerans has been isolated from aquatic insects, mosses, and animal feces, and its DNA has been found in water, soil, mats of bacteria and algae, fish, crayfish, aquatic insects, and other animals that live in or near water. A role for biting insects in transmission has been investigated, with particular focus on mosquitoes, giant water bugs, and Naucoridae. M. ulcerans is occasionally found in these insects, and they can sometimes transmit the bacteria in laboratory settings. Whether these insects are regularly involved in transmission remains unclear. Pre-existing wounds have been implicated in disease transmission, and people who immediately wash and bandage open wounds are less likely to acquire Buruli ulcer. Wearing pants and long-sleeved shirts is associated with a lower risk of Buruli ulcer, possibly by preventing insect bites or protecting wounds.

=== Genetic susceptibility ===
While Buruli ulcer is not contagious, susceptibility sometimes runs in families, suggesting genetics could play a role in who develops the disease. Severe Buruli ulcer in a Beninese family was attributed to a loss of 37 kilobases of chromosome 8 in a region that included a long non-coding RNA and was near the genes for beta-defensins, which are antimicrobial peptides involved in immunity and wound healing. Broader studies have focused on genes involved in susceptibility to other mycobacterial infections, finding susceptibility to Buruli ulcer may be linked to variants in six immunity-related genes: SLC11A1, PRKN, NOD2, ATG16L1, iNOS, and IFNG, as well as in two long non-coding RNAs. A genome-wide association study linked resistance to Buruli ulcer to a variant of ATG16L1 associated with susceptibility to Crohn's disease.

== Diagnosis ==
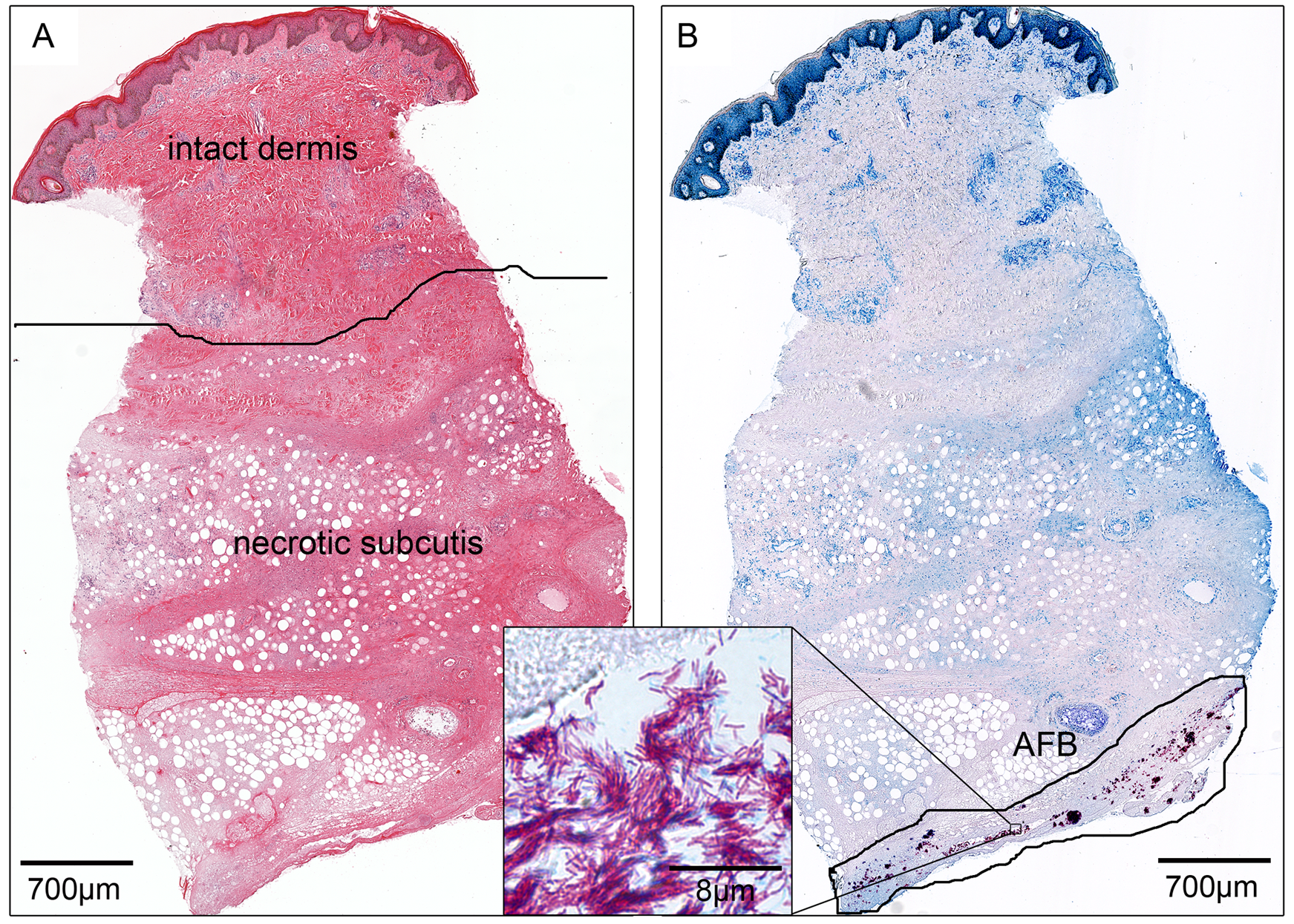
Photomicrographs of a punch biopsy from a Buruli ulcer plaque lesion. In the left image, the tissue sample has been stained with hematoxylin and eosin, a common stain for histopathology examination. In the right image, it has been stained with Ziehl–Neelsen stain, which helps to visualize mycobacteria. The inset shows red-staining (acid-fast) bacilli, suggestive of mycobacteria.

As Buruli ulcer most commonly occurs in low-resource settings, treatment is often initiated by a clinician based on signs and symptoms alone. Where available, diagnosis may then be confirmed by polymerase chain reaction (PCR) to detect M. ulcerans DNA or microscopy to detect mycobacteria. The gold standard test is real-time PCR to detect a DNA sequence termed IS2404 that is unique to M. ulcerans. This method detects M. ulcerans in 54–84% of infected people, and is highly specific to M. ulcerans. In wealthier healthcare settings, diagnosis is routinely based on PCR results. In low-resource settings, PCR is often unavailable, or can only be performed later at a centralized diagnostic laboratory. For microscopy, fluid is typically taken from the ulcer's edge by fine-needle aspiration or by swabbing the edge of the ulcer. The fluid is then stained with the Ziehl–Neelsen stain which makes mycobacteria visible. In practice microscopy detects M. ulcerans in just 30–40% of infected people, making it a relatively insensitive diagnostic test. For many bacterial infections, the gold standard for diagnosis is isolating and growing the infective organism in laboratory media. M. ulcerans can be grown in laboratory media, but its extremely slow growth rate prevents this from being used diagnostically; even under optimal growth conditions, the bacteria must grow for 9 to 12 weeks before they can be easily detected and identified. Another method of diagnosis is to take a tissue sample from the ulcer and examine it under histological stains. This requires more invasive sampling and review by a trained pathologist and is rarely used in places where Buruli ulcer is endemic.

Other ulcerative diseases can appear similar to Buruli ulcer at its various stages. The nodule that appears early in the disease can resemble a bug bite, sebaceous cyst, lipoma, onchocerciasis, other mycobacterial skin infections, or an enlarged lymph node. Skin ulcers can resemble those caused by leishmaniasis, yaws, squamous cell carcinoma, Haemophilus ducreyi infection, and tissue death due to poor circulation. More diffuse lesions can resemble cellulitis and fungal infections of the skin.

== Treatment ==
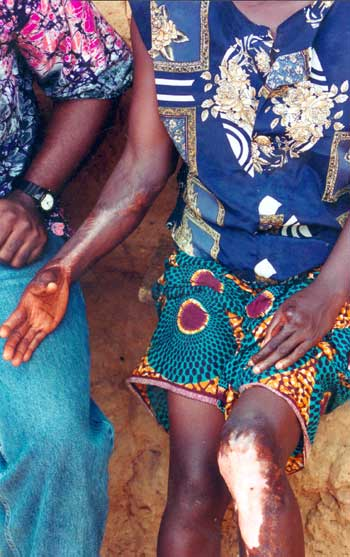
Healed Buruli ulcer lesions in a Ghanaian woman

Buruli ulcer is treated through a combination of antibiotics to kill the bacteria, and wound care or surgery to support the healing of the ulcer. The most widely used antibiotic regimen is once daily oral rifampicin plus twice-daily oral clarithromycin, recommended by the World Health Organization. Several other antibiotics are sometimes used in combination with rifampicin, namely ciprofloxacin, moxifloxacin, ethambutol, amikacin, azithromycin, and levofloxacin. A 2018 Cochrane review suggested that the many antibiotic combinations being used are effective treatments, but there is insufficient evidence to determine if any combination is the most effective. Approximately 1 in 5 people with Buruli ulcer experience a temporary worsening of symptoms 3 to 12 weeks after they begin taking antibiotics. This syndrome, called a paradoxical reaction, is more common in those with larger ulcers and ulcers on the trunk, and occurs more frequently in adults than in children. The paradoxical reaction in Buruli ulcer is thought to be due to the immune system responding to the wound as bacteria die and the immune-suppressing mycolactone dissipates.

Small or medium-sized ulcers (WHO categories I and II) typically heal within six months of antibiotic treatment, whereas larger ulcers can take over two years to fully heal. Given the long healing times, wound care is a major part of treating Buruli ulcer. The World Health Organization recommends standard wound care practices: covering the ulcer to keep it moist and protected from further damage, regularly changing wound dressings to keep the ulcer clean, removing excess fluid, and helping prevent infection. Treatment sometimes includes surgery to speed healing by removing necrotic ulcer tissue, grafting healthy skin over the wound, or removing scar tissue that can deform muscles and joints. Specialized wound dressings developed for non-infectious causes of ulcers are occasionally used for treating Buruli ulcer but can be prohibitively expensive in low-resource settings.

== Prevention ==
Buruli ulcers can be prevented by avoiding contact with aquatic environments in endemic areas, although this may not be possible for people living in these areas. The risk of acquiring it can be reduced by wearing long sleeves and pants, using insect repellent, and cleaning and covering any wounds as soon as they are noticed. There is no specific vaccine for preventing Buruli ulcer. The BCG vaccine typically given to children to protect against tuberculosis offers temporary partial protection from Buruli ulcer.

== Epidemiology ==
Status of buruli ulcer endemicity

Cases of Buruli ulcer reported to the World Health Organization in 2018. Color indicates case number: yellow, (1–150) Dem. Rep. Congo, Gabon, Guinea, Togo; orange (151–300), Benin, Cameroon, Côte d'Ivoire; light red (301–450), Liberia, Nigeria; dark red (451+), Ghana. Not shown are Australia (358), Papua New Guinea (12), and Japan (3).

1,862 cases of Buruli ulcer were reported to the World Health Organization in 2026. Most countries do not report data on Buruli ulcer to the World Health Organization, and the extent of its spread is unknown. In many endemic countries, health systems likely do not record each case due to insufficient reach and resources, and so the reported numbers probably underestimate the true prevalence of the disease.

Buruli ulcer is concentrated in West Africa and coastal Australia, with occasional cases in Japan, Papua New Guinea, and the Americas. In West Africa, the disease is predominantly reported from remote, rural communities in Benin, Côte d'Ivoire, Cameroon, and Ghana. Other countries in the region also have Buruli ulcer to some degree; a 2019 systematic review of prevalence studies found a clear consensus that it is present in the Democratic Republic of the Congo, Gabon, Liberia, Nigeria, Togo, and South Sudan, as well as "strong" or "very strong" evidence of the disease in the Republic of the Congo, Sierra Leone, the Central African Republic, Guinea, and Uganda. Buruli ulcer is regularly reported from Australia, where it occurs in coastal clusters—two in Queensland (near Rockhampton and north of Cairns) and two in Victoria (near Bairnsdale and Melbourne). It is more rarely reported from Japan, Papua New Guinea, and the Americas. Japan reports a few locally acquired cases per year scattered across the main island, Honshu. Papua New Guinea sporadically reports cases to the World Health Organization, typically less than a dozen per year. In the Americas, most Buruli ulcer is reported from French Guiana, with few cases described in surrounding countries. A 2019 review found "strong" evidence for the presence of Buruli ulcer in French Guiana and Peru, and "moderate" evidence in Brazil, Mexico and Suriname.

Within affected countries, Buruli ulcer tends to occur in rural areas near slow-moving or stagnant water. In particular, the disease tends to appear near water that has experienced human intervention, such as the building of dams or irrigation systems, flooding, or deforestation. Within endemic communities, few characteristics predict who will acquire Buruli ulcer. Males and females are equally likely to be infected. Ulcers can appear in people of all ages, although infections are most common among children between 5 and 15 years in West Africa, and adults over 40 in Australia and Japan.

== Society and culture ==
In endemic areas, particularly rural communities in Africa, people may be aware of Buruli ulcer's association with the environment, yet simultaneously associate it with witchcraft or other supernatural causes. This dual understanding of disease—combined with poor access to conventional medicine—drives many to seek traditional healers for primary care. Traditional healers often treat Buruli ulcers with two simultaneous approaches: herbs and sometimes burning or bleeding to treat the physical wound; and confession, ritual purification, and prohibitions on food, interpersonal contact, or sex to treat the spiritual component of the disease. Those with Buruli ulcer report feeling shame and experiencing social stigma that could affect their relationships, school attendance, and marriage prospects.

Buruli ulcer is known by several other names in different parts of the world. In southeastern Australia, it was originally called "Searls' ulcer" after the physician J. R. Searls who saw the first Australian patients at the Bairnsdale Clinic and sent material to Peter MacCallum's group for further examination. The disease later became more generally known as "Bairnsdale ulcer" after the district where it was described. In northeastern Australia, north of Cairns, the disease is called "Daintree ulcer" or "Mossman ulcer" after the nearby Daintree River and the town of Mossman. In Papua New Guinea, the disease is called "Kumusi ulcer" after the Kumusi River along which villages with Buruli ulcer were originally described.

== History ==
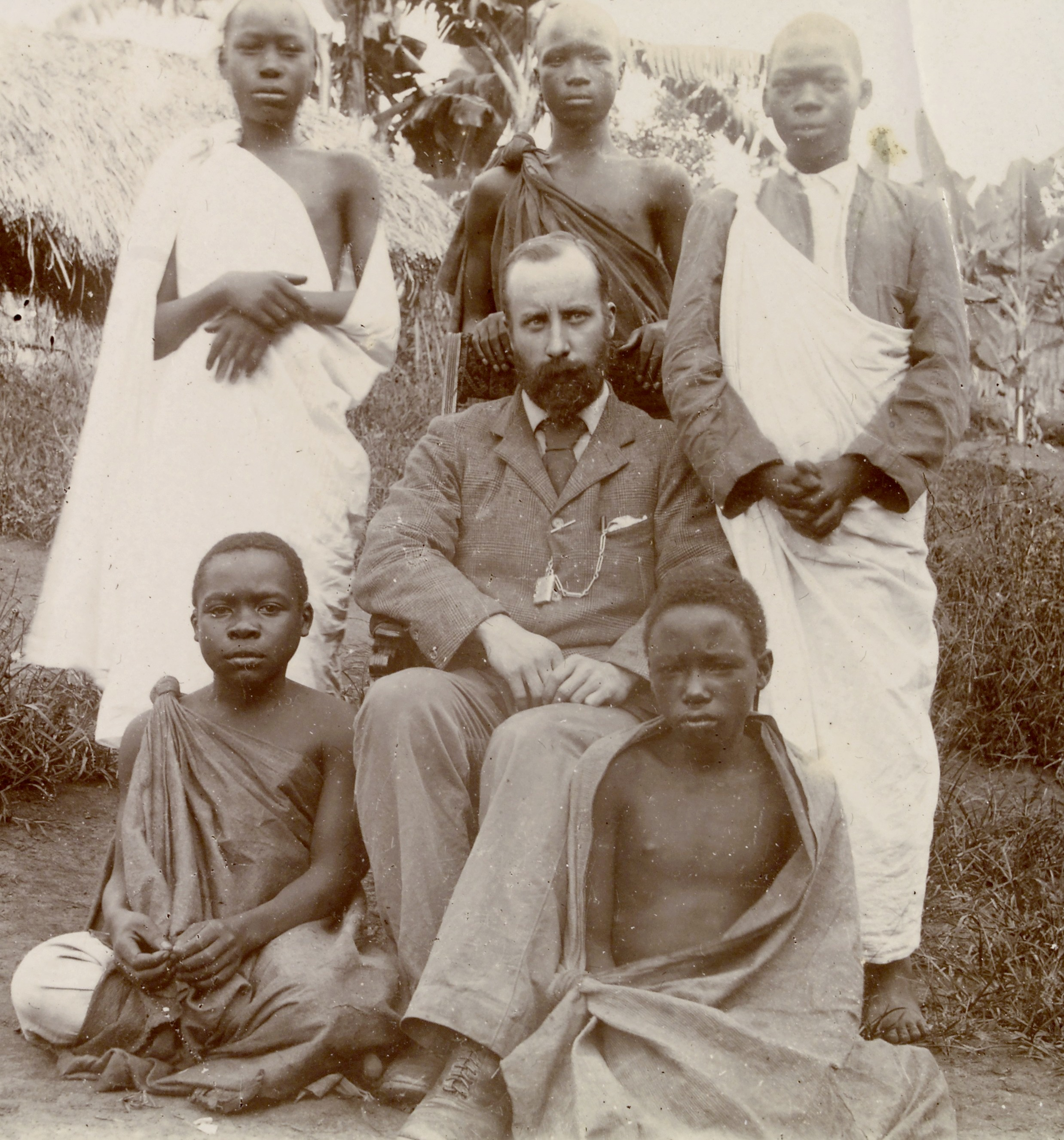
Albert R. Cook (center) at Mengo Hospital in 1897. Cook was the first to describe Buruli ulcer.

The first written description of Buruli ulcer is credited to a British missionary doctor, Albert R. Cook. In 1897, at Mengo Hospital in Uganda, Cook noted several patients with slow-healing ulcers. The cause of these slow-healing ulcers was identified 50 years later in 1948, when Peter MacCallum, Jean Tolhurst, Glen Buckle, and H. A. Sissons at The Alfred Hospital's Baker Institute described a series of cases from Bairnsdale, Victoria, isolated the causative mycobacterium, and showed it could cause ulcers in laboratory rats. Over the following decades, more cases were described in Africa. A particularly high prevalence in Uganda's Buruli County led to the disease becoming more widely known as "Buruli ulcer".

In 1998, the World Health Organization started the Global Buruli Ulcer Initiative to coordinate global efforts to control the disease. This was followed in 2004 by World Health Organization Resolution WHA57.1 calling upon member countries to support the Global Buruli Ulcer Initiative and increase research on Buruli ulcer diagnostics and treatment. Interest in Buruli ulcer has been encouraged by its branding as a "neglected tropical disease", first in a 2005 PLOS Medicine article, and later by both the World Health Organization and PLOS Neglected Tropical Diseases.

From the time the disease was described, Buruli ulcer was treated with surgery to remove all affected tissue, followed by prolonged wound care. This treatment regimen was expensive, sometimes disfiguring, and often ineffective, with ulcers recurring in up to a third of cases. Treatment dramatically improved in 2004, when the World Health Organization recommended an eight-week course of daily oral rifampicin and injected streptomycin. The introduction of antibiotics reduced the rate of ulcer recurrence to fewer than 2% of cases. However, streptomycin can be toxic to the ears and kidneys, and administering daily injections is challenging in low-resource settings. In 2017, the World Health Organization updated its recommendation to replace streptomycin with the oral antibiotic clarithromycin.

== Research ==
Buruli ulcer has been the subject of scientific research since the description of M. ulcerans in 1948, and the demonstration that the bacteria could cause ulcers in laboratory animals. While several animals are susceptible to M. ulcerans ulcers, mice (particularly BALB/c and C57BL/6 mice) are most commonly used to model Buruli ulcer in modern laboratories. Since M. ulcerans can only grow in relatively cool temperatures, mice are typically infected in furless parts of the body: the ear, tail, or footpad. After injection into the mouse, bacteria double every three to four days, and the first signs of skin disease appear after three to four weeks. This mouse model of Buruli ulcer has primarily been used to test antibiotics. The antibiotic combinations, dose frequencies, and treatment durations currently in use were first tested in laboratory-infected mice. Some vaccine platforms have been tested in M. ulcerans-infected mice, mostly based on the Mycobacterium bovis strain used in the BCG vaccine. The BCG vaccine and versions of the vaccine that also express M. ulcerans antigens prolong the survival of mice after M. ulcerans infection. As of 2019, no vaccine tested completely protects mice from infection.

M. ulcerans can be grown in laboratory media, although its slow growth makes it challenging to study. Bacteria plated on laboratory media can take up to three months to form visible colonies. Strains of M. ulcerans used in laboratories are less standardized than the mice they infect; different laboratories use different strains based on convenience and accessibility. Three M. ulcerans strains are particularly common, each isolated from an infected person: "Cu001" from Adzopé, Côte d'Ivoire in 1996; "Mu1615" from Malaysia in the 1960s; and "S1013" from Cameroon in 2010.

== Other animals ==
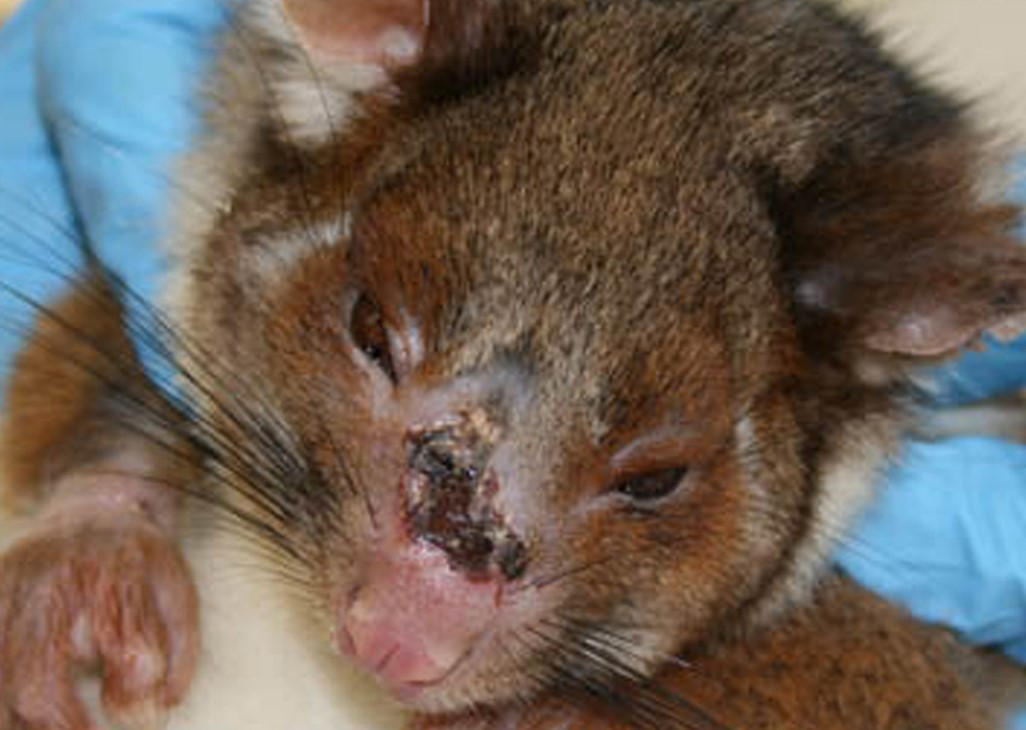
A common ringtail possum with an ulcer caused by M. ulcerans.

M. ulcerans infection can cause Buruli ulcer-like lesions in some non-human animals. Natural non-human infections have only been described in coastal Victoria, near Melbourne. There, M. ulcerans-positive lesions have been described in koalas, common ringtail possums, and common brushtail possums, with lesions typically on the face, limbs, and tail. Ulcers have also been reported on domesticated animals, namely dogs, horses, alpacas, and a cat. In laboratories several species of animals have been infected with M. ulcerans in an attempt to model the course of Buruli ulcer. Injection of M. ulcerans can cause ulcers in several rodents (mice, guinea pigs, greater cane rats and common African rats), larger mammals (nine-banded armadillos, common brushtail possums, pigs, and Cynomolgus monkeys), and anole lizards.
