= Jean Tolhurst =

Australian bacteriologist

Jean Christa Tolhurst was an Australian bacteriologist who discovered Mycobacterium ulcerans, the organism responsible for skin ulcers. She was an accomplished scientist who made critical contributions to medical microbiology, antibiotics, and chemotherapy under great physical hardship.

== Early life ==
Jean Tolhurst was born in Goulburn, New South Wales on 19 December 1911 to Adolphus Henry Tolhurst and Alice Betts. She was their fifth and youngest child.

Tolhurst's father was a Presbyterian minister who served as a padre in Gallipoli and France during World War I. After his death in 1930 Melbourne, a special scholarship for the children of war veterans enabled Tolhurst to study bacteriology at the University of Melbourne. She graduated with a Bachelor of Science in 1934.

== Career ==
Shortly after graduating from university, Tolhurst was appointed as a Research Assistant to W.J. Penfold, the inaugural Director of the Baker Institute at the Alfred Hospital. Her first piece of research was an experimental study, in collaboration with Penfold, on the effectiveness of injecting formol-toxoids as a preventative measure for gas gangrene in guinea pigs and mice. After successful experimentation with animals, she injected herself with modified toxin for further testing of its effectiveness in humans. This study and others allowed her to obtain a Master of Science degree and led to her appointment as Senior Bacteriologist at the Alfred Hospital, which she held for the remainder of her life.

From 1936 to 1943, Tolhurst collaborated with Leonard Cox, Alfred Hospital's Consultant neurologist, to investigate cases of cryptococcosis (then known as torulosis). Their investigation included the isolation of the torulae from cerebrospinal fluid, sputum and tissue lesions, as well as the fungi's cultural properties and their pathogenicity for laboratory animals. Their findings were formally published in 1946 by the Melbourne University Press and was the first comprehensive monograph on the subject of human torulosis.

Alongside her research on torulosis, Tolhurst also investigated the bacteriology of chronic ulceration in the human skin. She focused her investigation on the properties of M. ulcerans, the organism responsible for skin ulcers which she and her assistant, Glen Buckle, discovered. The full account of their discovery was detailed in 1948 in The Journal of Pathology and Bacteriology, along with descriptions of the pathology and clinical aspects of the mycobacterial infections by Peter MacCallum and H.A. Sissons.

From 1948, onwards the demands of a busy clinical bacteriology laboratory and rheumatoid arthritis limited Tolhurst's ability to continue her research on little-known mycobacteria. She turned her attention to hospital cross-infections, operating-theatre infections, and the growing field of chemotherapy. On chemotherapy in particular, her colleagues viewed her as a well-read expert with extensive practical experience and she was frequently consulted on treatment advice.

For the last 20 years of her life, nearly every serious case of microbial infection requiring antibiotic or chemotherapeutic treatment in Alfred Hospital was discussed with her. Her esteemed and versatile knowledge in these spaces formed the basis of the monograph Chemotherapy with antibiotics and allied drugs, with the first edition published in 1955 and larger versions in 1963, 1972, and 1978. This comprehensive publication was highly valuable for Australian medical practitioners, so much so that the National Health and Medical Research Council issued it to them for free. It received excellent reviews in Australia, the United Kingdom, and the United States of America, though it never had wide circulation as it was unavailable for purchase in bookstores.

In 1961 the University of Melbourne awarded Tolhurst a Doctor of Science degree for her acclaimed published works.

== Hobbies ==
Outside of her working life, Tolhurst was an avid gardener with additional interests in music, the arts, and literature. She owned a small weekend and holiday cottage in the Dandenong hills of Victoria, where she cultivated around an acre of trees, shrubs, native plants, and a rock garden.

== Later life ==
By 1960 Tolhurst's arthritis had left her terribly crippled. Despite this, she continued to drive her own car, live in her own apartment, and work full-time. In 1962, after several debates with wary doctors, she travelled overseas for the first time and spent nearly six months in the United Kingdom. She visited friends, family, and several university departments, often in a wheelchair. She also spent three weeks visiting Switzerland, Austria, Venice, Florence, and Rome with her sister Margaret and brother-in-law Rupert Willis.

In November 1966, Tolhurst died of sudden apoplexy.
