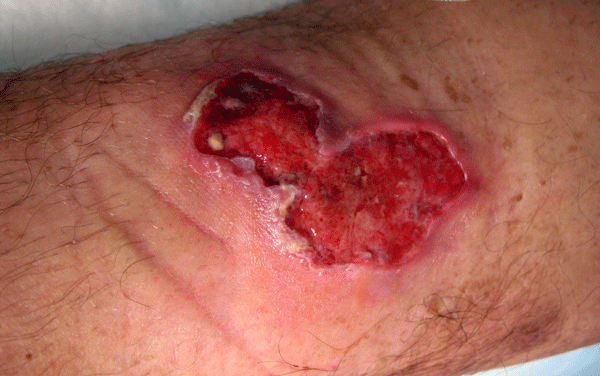

Scientific classification
- Domain: Bacteria
- Kingdom: Bacillati
- Phylum: Actinomycetota
- Class: Actinomycetia
- Order: Mycobacteriales
- Family: Mycobacteriaceae
- Genus: Mycobacterium
- Species: M. ulcerans

Binomial name
- Mycobacterium ulcerans MacCallum et al., 1950

= Mycobacterium ulcerans =

Species of bacterium

Mycobacterium ulcerans is a species of bacteria found in various aquatic environments. The bacteria can infect humans and some other animals, causing persistent open wounds called Buruli ulcer. M. ulcerans is closely related to Mycobacterium marinum, from which it evolved around one million years ago, and more distantly to the mycobacteria which cause tuberculosis and leprosy.

== Description ==
Mycobacterium ulcerans are rod-shaped bacteria. They appear purple ("Gram positive") under Gram stain and bright red ("acid fast") under Ziehl–Neelsen stain. On laboratory media, M. ulcerans grow slowly, forming small transparent colonies after four weeks. As colonies age, they develop irregular outlines and a rough, yellow surface. The bacteria was discovered by Australian scientists Jean Tolhurst and Glen Buckle in the late 1940s.

== Taxonomy and evolution ==
Mycobacterium ulcerans is a species of mycobacteria within the phylum Actinomycetota. Within the genus Mycobacterium, M. ulcerans is classified as both a "non-tuberculous mycobacterium" and a "slow-growing mycobacterium".

- Mycobacterium
  - Rapidly-growing mycobacteria
  - - Mycobacterium leprae (cause of leprosy)
    - - Mycobacterium tuberculosis complex (cause of tuberculosis)
      - - Mycobacterium marinum
        - Mycobacterium ulcerans

A cladogram showing the relationships among the mycobacteria that cause disease in humans.

M. ulcerans likely evolved from the closely related aquatic pathogen Mycobacterium marinum around one million years ago. The two species are genetically very similar, and have identical 16S ribosomal RNA genes. However relative to M. marinum, M. ulcerans has undergone substantial genome reduction, shedding over a thousand kilobases of genetic content including nearly 1300 genes (23% of the total M. marinum genes) and sustaining the inactivation of an additional 700 genes. Some of these genes were inactivated by the proliferation of two mobile genetic elements, called "IS2404" (213 copies) and "IS2606" (91 copies), neither of which are present in M. marinum. Additionally, M. ulcerans has acquired a 174 kilobase plasmid, termed "pMUM001", which is involved in the production of the toxin mycolactone. Other closely related mycobacteria produce mycolactone and infect various aquatic animals; these are sometimes described as distinct species (M. pseudoshottsii, M. liflandii, M. shinshuense and sometimes M. marinum) and sometimes as different lineages of M. ulcerans. Regardless, all mycolactone-producing mycobacteria share a common ancestor distinct from non-mycolactone-producing M. marinum.
