= Functional molecular infection epidemiology =

Functional Molecular Infection Epidemiology (FMIE) is an emerging area of medicine that entails the study of pathogen genes and genomes in the context of their functional association with the host niches (adhesion, invasion, adaptation) and the complex interactions they trigger within the host immune system (cell signaling, apoptosis) to culminate in varied outcomes of the infection. This can also be defined as the correlation of genetic variations in a pathogen or its respective host with a unique function that is important for disease severity, disease progression, or host susceptibility to a particular pathogen. Functional epidemiology implies not only descriptive host-pathogen genomic associations, but rather the interplay between pathogen and host genomic variations to functionally demonstrate the role of the genetic variations during infection.

Functional Molecular Infection Epidemiology differs from classical Molecular Infection Epidemiology mainly in that the latter deals with the tagging and tracking of the infectious agent without much concern for the functional/phenotypic characteristics of the agent being tracked. Functional molecular epidemiology, on the other hand, lays more emphasis on genotypic and phenotypic correlates of host-pathogen interaction, adaptation or homeostasis. Furthermore, classical molecular epidemiology largely uses "neutral" markers, such as insertion sequences and intergenic elements, while functional molecular epidemiology harnesses functionally relevant markers such as SNPs and genome co-ordinates with putative roles in infection biology – both on the pathogen and the host side. Many studies have been conducted which fit the theme of FMIE - for example, acquisition and transmission of the Mycobacterium avium subsp. paratuberculosis and its role in the development of Type-1 diabetes mellitus when human gene SLC11A1 undergoes particular mutations in a susceptible host.

The concept of FMIE has become potentially relevant in the aftermath of multiple genome sequencing and resequencing of important bacterial pathogens from many different host/patient populations.

A consortium of scientists in India and Germany is (Project BRIDGE) already formed under the aegis of the Freie University in Berlin and the University of Hyderabad to explore and investigate the application of FMIE in public health and Veterinary arena as a part of the DFG funded project - GRK1673 under the joint leadership of Niyaz Ahmed (University of Hyderabad) and Lothar H. Wieler (Free University of Berlin), who proposed and introduced the term 'Functional Molecular Infection Epidemiology' initially in the context of H. pylori and later expanded the field to include several other pathogens.
