= Global Buruli Ulcer Initiative =

World Health Organization initiative

The Global Buruli Ulcer Initiative (GBUI) is a World Health Organization (WHO) initiative to coordinate global efforts to control Buruli ulcer, an infectious disease characterized by the development of painless open wounds. It was started in 1998 after a 1997 visit to Côte d'Ivoire by Hiroshi Nakajima, who was then the general director of the WHO, recognizing the lack of research and a growing disease burden.

Initially established with funding from the Nippon Foundation, as of 2020 the GBUI involves more than 40 nongovernmental organizations, research institutions, and other foundations. A 2004 WHO resolution "called for increasing surveillance and control, and for intensified research to develop tools to diagnose, treat and prevent" Buruli ulcer. In 2009, a strategy to promote early detection and provide wider access to antibiotics was adopted. A bi-annual meeting is held in Geneva to bring researcher institutions, nongovernmental agencies, and representatives from countries with Buruli ulcer together.
