= MLSA =

MLSA is an initialism that can refer to a number of things:

- Medical Laboratory Scientists' Association, an Irish trade union
- Ministry of Labour Staff Association, a former British trade union
- MLSA1 and MLSA2, genes required for mycolactone biosynthesis
- Multilocus sequence analysis, a molecular biology technique involving Multilocus sequence typing
- Museum and Library Services Act, that established the Institute of Museum and Library Services
- Mutual Logistics Support Agreement, an agreement signed in 2002 as part of Philippines–United States relations
