= Lee Jong-wook =

South Korean physician (1945–2006)

- 이종욱
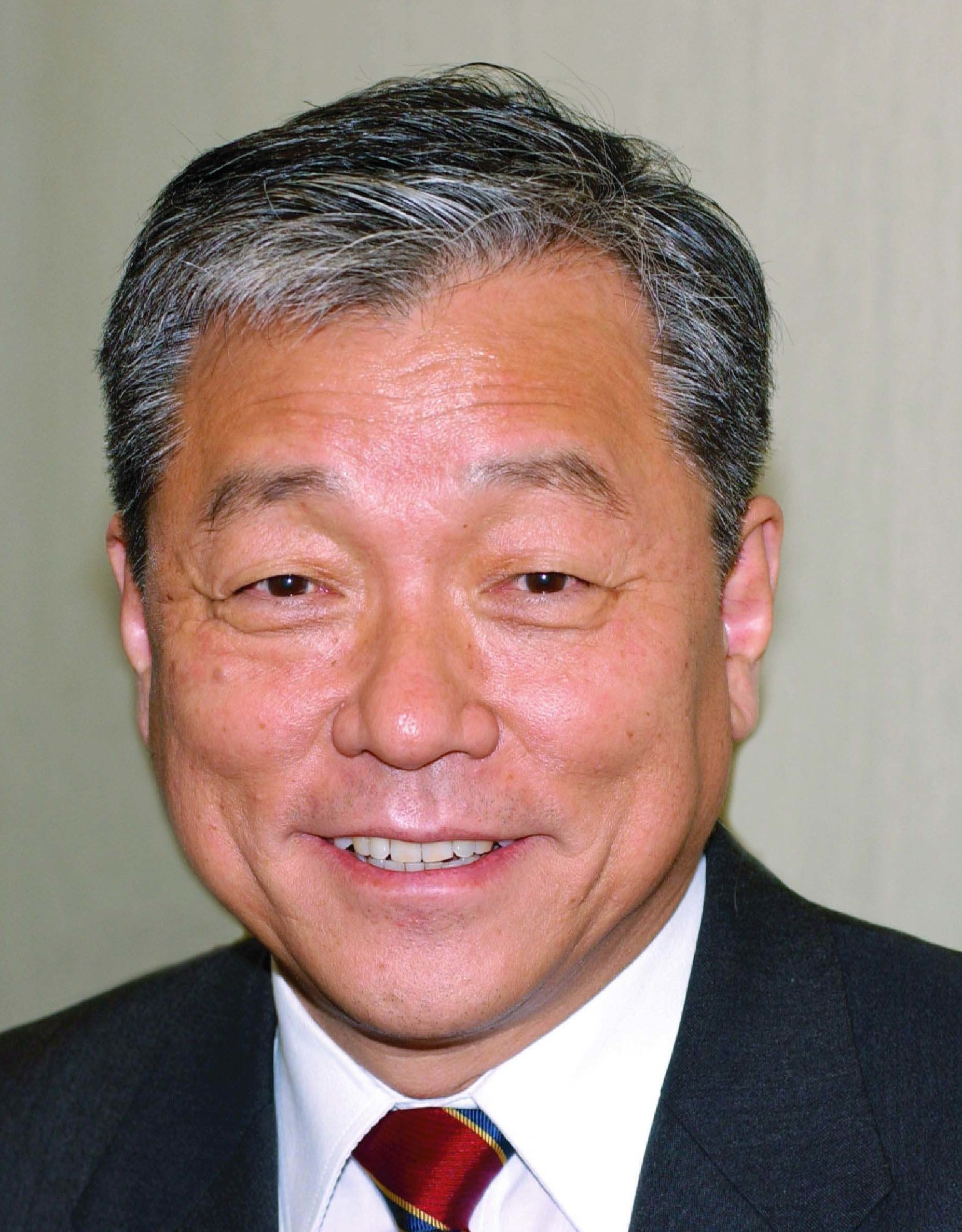
- Lee in 2005

6th Director-General of the World Health Organization
- In office 21 July 2003 – 22 May 2006
- Preceded by: Gro Harlem Brundtland
- Succeeded by: Anders Nordström (acting)

Personal details
- Born: 12 April 1945 Keijō, Keiki-dō, Korea, Empire of Japan
- Died: 22 May 2006 (aged 61) Geneva University Hospital, Geneva, Switzerland
- Resting place: Daejeon National Cemetery, Daejeon, South Korea
- Education: Hanyang University (B.E.); Seoul National University (MD); University of Hawaiʻi (MMed)
- Profession: Physician

- Korean name
- Hangul: 이종욱
- Hanja: 李鍾郁
- RR: I Jonguk
- MR: I Chonguk

Lee Jong-wook (Korean: 이종욱; 12 April 1945 – 22 May 2006) was a South Korean physician. He was the director-general of the World Health Organization for three years. Lee joined the WHO in 1983, working on a variety of projects including the Global Programme for Vaccines and Immunizations and Stop Tuberculosis. He began his term as director-general in 2004, and was the first figure from Korea to lead an international agency.

In 2004, Lee was listed as one of the 100 most influential people in the world by Time magazine.

== Early life ==
Born on 12 April 1945 in Keijō, Keiki-dō, Korea, Empire of Japan (now Seoul, South Korea).

Lee received a Bachelors in Engineering from Hanyang University, followed by a medical degree at Seoul National University, and a Master of Medicine at the University of Hawaiʻi in public health. He is the third son in a family of six children; he has three brothers and two sisters. Two of his brothers are professors.

Lee took care of leprosy patients in Anyang, South Korea when he was studying medicine. There were few medical facilities set up at the time and he worked in a volunteer capacity. He met and later married Kaburaki Reiko, a Japanese woman who visited Korea in order to volunteer in the country.

== WHO career ==
He worked at the World Health Organization (WHO), at country, regional and headquarter levels for 23 years. His work in WHO started in 1983 when he worked with leprosy in Fiji. He started his work as an advisor on leprosy, and later also treated tuberculosis and promoted the vaccination of children against preventable diseases.

In 1994, Lee moved to Geneva to work at WHO headquarters as chief in prevention and vaccines. In 1995, he was nicknamed Vaccine Czar according to Scientific American. Lee became official candidate for 6th director-generals of WHO.

- 1983–2006: Staff of WHO
- 1994–98: Director in Global Programme for Vaccines and Immunization, and Executive Secretary, Children's Vaccine Initiative
- 1998–99: Senior Policy Adviser to 5th General, Gro Harlem Brundtland
- 1999–2000: Special Representative of the Director-General
- 2003–2006: Director-General of WHO

He had said that global efforts to control the HIV/AIDS pandemic would be the right course that would give meaning to his tenure as director-general of the agency.

The 3 by 5 policy, which was the basic idea of Lee, was largely criticized by many concerned people. International AIDS Society president Joep Lange, had a comment that the project was "totally unrealistic". Médecins sans Frontières, also expressed similar reservations toward Lee's plan.

He visited 60 countries in the three years of his Generalship including Darfur, Sudan, sites of the Indian Ocean tsunami, Madagascar, Mauritius. He was famed as a man of action during this time. His adventurous spirit led him to "experience more, see more, and do more," said his son Tadahiro.

== Death and commemoration ==
He died on 22 May 2006, in intensive care unit of Geneva University Hospital, Switzerland, following emergency surgery for a blood clot in the brain (a subdural hematoma). He had been preparing for UN general meetings when he fell ill at a weekend luncheon.

Secretary General of United Nations at that time, Kofi Annan mentioned

The world has lost a great man today. He was a strong voice for the right of every man, woman, and child to health prevention and care, and advocated on behalf of the very poorest people.

President George W. Bush of the United States said

Dr. Lee worked tirelessly to improve the health of millions of people, from combating tuberculosis and HIV/AIDS to his aggressive efforts to eradicate polio. He provided tremendous leadership to the international community as it confronted the challenges of the 21st century, including the threat of an influenza pandemic. Dr. Lee's outreach to world leaders and entities increased awareness of potentially devastating public health dangers.

He was posthumously awarded the Hibiscus Cordon (Grand Cross) of the Order of Civil Merit by the South Korean government. He was survived by Reiko Kaburaki Lee; the couple has one son, Tadahiro Lee. Reiko continues to volunteer in Peru helping poor women and children.

== Memorial award ==
The South Korean government officially announced the establishment of the a Memorial Prize in Lee's memory. After his death, You Si min, the Minister of Health and Welfare of the Republic of Korea, officially revealed the plans concerning the new awards and urged other nations and persons concerned to participate at a meeting of WHO in 2007. Mr. Lee Sung-joo, who is permanent representative of the Republic of Korea, spoke of the award in Dr. Lee's memory to motivate and inspire young leaders aspiring to be the next Dr. Lee Jong-wook.

Starting in 2009, the awards would be given for mainly the fields "young leadership" and "contributor of health management" (especially for epidemics) at the annual assembly of WHO, which takes place in May each year.

== See also ==
- Kyungbock High School

Positions in intergovernmental organisations
Preceded by Gro Harlem Brundtland	Director-General of the World Health Organization; 2004–2006	Succeeded by Anders Nordström Acting
