= Niyaz Ahmed =

Indian molecular epidemiologist

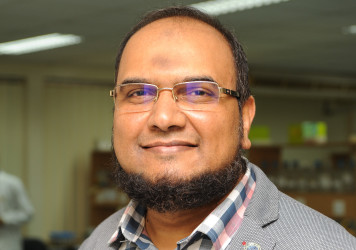
- Niyaz Ahmed
- Born: 25 December 1971 (age 54); Paras, Maharashtra, India
- Education: Manipal University (Ph.D)
- Awards: Shanti Swarup Bhatnagar Prize, National Bioscience Award, Fellow of the American Academy of Microbiology, Microsoft Azure for Research Award in public health, Conrad N. Hilton Humanitarian Prize (team icddr,b)
- Scientific career
- Fields: Bacterial genomics Molecular epidemiology
- Workplaces: ICDDRB (2016-2020) University of Hyderabad (2008 -) Universiti Malaya (2010 -) and Academy of Scientific and Innovative Research (2013 - 2016)
- Website: Official website

Niyaz Ahmed is an Indian molecular epidemiologist, a senior professor of microbial sciences, genomicist, and a veterinarian by training, based in Hyderabad.

== Biography ==
Ahmed was born in Paras of Maharashtra state in 1971 and completed his early schooling from Akola. He went on to graduate in Veterinary Medicine in 1995 (Nagpur) and obtained further degrees in Animal Biotechnology (NDRI, Karnal) and Biotechnology/Infectious Diseases (PhD) (Manipal University). In December 2008, he joined the University of Hyderabad as a member of the Faculty and went on to serve as Chairman of the Department of Biotechnology and Bioinformatics. He served as senior director at the International Centre for Diarrhoeal Disease Research in Dhaka. Ahmed was affiliated with the University of Malaya, Kuala Lumpur, Malaysia as a visiting professor of Molecular Biosciences at the Institute of Biological Sciences and was an adjunct professor of the Academy of Scientific and Innovative Research, India. Ahmed is currently working as Senior Professor at the School of Life Sciences at the University of Hyderabad. He served as senior director from November 2016 to March 2020 at the International Centre for Diarrhoeal Disease Research (icddr,b), also as a member of the Senior Leadership Team (SLT) of the centre.

== Legacy ==
Having fathered molecular epidemiology in India, Ahmed's work provided wheels to the emerging discipline of Functional molecular infection epidemiology. His research interests encompass genomics, evolution and molecular pathogenesis of enteric pathogens with major emphasis on virulence and antimicrobial resistance. He also contributed important initial studies on the two co-evolved human pathogens, namely, Mycobacterium tuberculosis and Helicobacter pylori, in the context of evolution of adaptation mechanisms, and acquisition and optimization of virulence during colonization/infection. Ahmed also has interest in comparative genomics of bacterial pathogens obtained from single patients at different occasions and this approach nurtures the concept of 'chronological evolution and replicative genomics' as tools to study host-microbe interaction over time. Ahmed's group has developed a widely used multilocus sequence typing scheme for species level identification of pathogenic Leptospira with a potential to replace the highly ambiguous serotyping method that currently is used for Leptospiral strain identification. Ahmed has also worked extensively on the nomenclature, taxonomic status, genome sequencing and functional characterization of Mycobacterium indicus pranii, a non-pathogenic mycobacterial species with very high translational promise as an immunotherapeutic. Ahmed taught courses in Molecular and Cell Biology, Intellectual Property Rights and Biosafety, Research and Publication Ethics and Research Methodology.

== Recognitions, awards and honors ==
Niyaz Ahmed served as Section Editor (Genomics and Microbiology) of PLoS ONE (from August 2008 to September 2013) wherein he provided editorial oversight to the "PLoS ONE Prokaryotic Genome Collection". Ahmed also served as a member of the PLoS International Advisory Group and has been serving as the founding Editor-in-Chief of Gut Pathogens journal since 2009, published by BioMed Central Ltd. (London). Ahmed was elected as fellow of the National Academy of Sciences of India and was admitted as fellow of the Royal Society of Chemistry in January 2015 and a fellow of the American Academy of Microbiology in 2018. Niyaz Ahmed was a key member of the leadership team, as senior director, at icddr,b when the organization was awarded the 2017 Conrad N. Hilton Humanitarian Prize . Niyaz Ahmed was prominently chronicled in a coffee table book released by the Indian Government titled '75 under 50 scientists shaping today's India' .

Ahmed is serving as a member of the editorial boards of the following scientific journals:

- Gut Pathogens - Editor in Chief
- Infection Genetics and Evolution - Senior Editor
- Helicobacter - Editorial Board Member

Ahmed has been awarded with the following awards:

- Asian Scientist 100, Asian Scientist - 2017
- Shanti Swarup Bhatnagar Prize, India's highest science award - 2016
- National Bioscience Award for Career Development - 2011
- University of Hyderabad Chancellor's Award - 2015
