= Anders Nordström =

Swedish physician and diplomat (born 1960)

Acting Director-General of the World Health Organization
- In office 22 May 2006 – 8 November 2006
- Preceded by: Lee Jong-wook
- Succeeded by: Margaret Chan

Director-General of the Swedish International Development Cooperation Agency (Sida)
- In office February 2008 – June 2010

Ambassador for Global Health, Swedish Ministry for Foreign Affairs
- In office March 2012 – March 2015

Head of Country Office, World Health Organization in Sierra Leone
- In office April 2015 – June 2017

Ambassador for Global Health, Swedish Ministry for Foreign Affairs
- In office September 2017 – September 2023

Personal details
- Born: 9 March 1960 (age 66) Sweden
- Education: Karolinska Institute
- Profession: Physician, diplomat

Anders Nordström (born 9 March 1960) is a Swedish physician who served as Acting Director-General of the World Health Organization (WHO) from 22 May 2006 to 8 November 2006.

== Career ==
Nordström trained as a physician at Karolinska Institutet and has experience in the field of national and international health policy and planning and strategic leadership. Nordström worked with the Swedish Red Cross in Cambodia and the International Committee of the Red Cross in Iran. He has also worked for the Swedish International Development Cooperation Agency (Sida) for over 12 years, including 3 years in Zambia.

In 2002, Nordström briefly served as the Interim Executive Director for the Global Fund to Fight AIDS, Tuberculosis and Malaria.

Nordström became Assistant Director-General for General Management at WHO in July 2003 and, in May 2006, Acting Director-General on the death of Lee Jong-wook. Later named WHO Assistant Director-General for Health Systems and Services, one of his main contributions was to advance policy for manpower in health services, especially for low-income countries.

Nordström served as the Director General of SIDA from January 2008 to May 2010. In May 2010, after the effects of the Swedish aid-budget decline due to the 2008 financial crisis, he was requested to resign because of the agency's financial difficulties.

Later, in April 2012, Minister for International Development Cooperation Gunilla Carlsson appointed Nordström as the declared "world's first Global Health Ambassador". On behalf of the Swedish Government he has the formal title as Ambassador and leads a team to oversee and strategically advise the Ministry for Foreign Affairs on a substantial global health portfolio.

In April 2015, after a tenure as Sweden's Ambassador for Global Health, Nordström was appointed back to WHO as the organisation's country representative to Sierra Leone for two years. In 2020, he was appointed to head the secretariat of the Independent Panel for Pandemic Preparedness and Response (IPPPR), which is chaired by Helen Clark and Ellen Johnson Sirleaf. Since 2022, he has been a member of the Commission for Universal Health convened by Chatham House and co-chaired by Helen Clark and Jakaya Kikwete.

== Other activities ==
- Virchow Prize for Global Health, Member of the Council (since 2022)

== See also ==
- Tedros Adhanom Ghebreyesus

Positions in intergovernmental organisations
Preceded by Lee Jong-wook	Director-General of the World Health Organization Acting; 2006	Succeeded by Margaret Chan
