= Marcolino Gomes Candau =

Brazilian doctor (1911–1983)

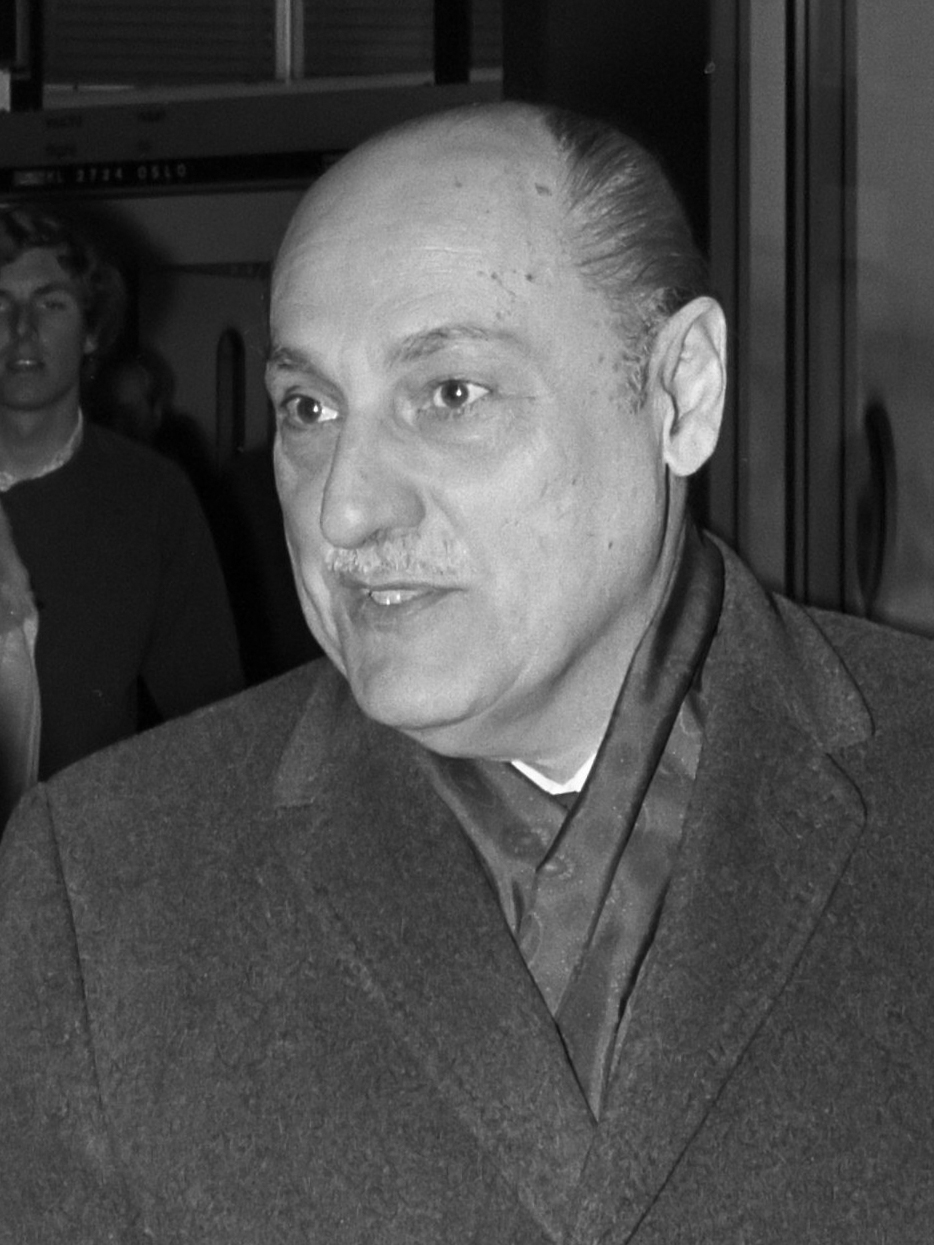
- Candau in 1972

2nd Director-General of the World Health Organization
- In office 1953–1973
- Secretary General: Dag Hammarskjöld (1953–1961); U Thant (1961–1971); Kurt Waldheim (1972–1981)
- Preceded by: Brock Chisholm
- Succeeded by: Halfdan T. Mahler

Personal details
- Born: 30 May 1911 Rio de Janeiro, Brazil
- Died: 23 January 1983 (aged 71) Geneva, Switzerland
- Education: Rio de Janeiro State University; Johns Hopkins University

Marcolino Gomes Candau (30 May 1911 – 23 January 1983) was a Brazilian doctor who served as director-general of the World Health Organization (WHO) from 1953 to 1973.

He did doctorate and other courses such as MPH, and FRCP before served at WHO.

== Biography ==
Candau was born in Rio de Janeiro and studied medicine at the Rio de Janeiro State University and worked at the state department of Health before pursuing Masters in Public Health at Johns Hopkins University.

Candau returned to Brazil to work in the state public health department before joining the staff of the World Health Organization in Geneva in 1950 as Director of the Division of Organization of Health Services for the Americas. Within a year, he was appointed Assistant Director-General in charge of Advisory Services. In 1952, he moved to Washington as Assistant Director of the Pan American Sanitary Bureau—the WHO Regional Office for the Americas. In 1953, while occupying that position, he was elected, at the age of 42, WHO's second Director-General. As Director-General, Candau was influenced by his previous work in Brazil's malaria control program. He presented the case for global malaria eradication at the World Health Assembly meeting in Mexico City in May 1955. In 1958, 1963 and 1968, Dr Candau was re-elected for his successive terms in that office, which he held until 1973. In 1963 Candau received an honorary Sc.D. from Bates College.

Marcolino Candau, in his capacity as Director-General of the World Health Organization, paid an official visit to Portugal in 1956, during the Estado Novo regime, in order to assess the condition of the Portuguese health system. He observed a marked lack of coordination within the national sanitary structure and further identified significant deficiencies in both the quantity and quality of human resources in the health sector.

== Sources ==
- 2006 Bates College Alumni Directory (Lewiston, ME: Bates College 2006)

Positions in intergovernmental organisations
Preceded by Brock Chisholm	Director-General of the World Health Organization; 1953–1973	Succeeded by Halfdan T. Mahler
