= Bella MacCallum =

New Zealand and British botanist and mycologist (1886–1927)

- Born: 1886; Timaru, New Zealand
- Died: 17 March 1927 (aged 40–41)
- Education: Canterbury College; University of New Zealand; Cambridge Medical School; University of Edinburgh
- Spouse: Lance (Lancelot) Shadwell Jennings (m. 1915; died 1916) Professor Peter MacCallum (m. 1919–1927)
- Scientific career
- Fields: Botany and Mycology

Bella Dytes MacIntosh MacCallum (née Cross, 1886 – 17 March 1927) was a New Zealand and British botanist and mycologist and was New Zealand's first female doctor of science.

== Early life and education ==
MacCallum was born in Timaru, New Zealand, the daughter of George and Rebecca Cross. She attended Timaru Girls' High School, then Canterbury College, earning a bachelor's degree in 1908 and a master's degree in 1909 with First Class Honours in botany, focussing on halophyte plant adaptations to salty soil. Her master's degree involved field observations and anatomical studies, and compared botanical formations in Christchurch to Timaru. She was awarded a National Research Scholarship, which she used to continue research on wetland plants. She taught at high-schools before she earned her doctorate from the University of New Zealand in 1917 with a thesis on Phormium (N.Z. flax), titled Phormium with Regard to Its Economic Importance; a work whose origins in 1909 were inspired by the work and advice of Dr Leonard Cockayne. She represented her university in tennis, was a member of the hockey 1st XI, and the Executive of the Students' Association.

== Family ==
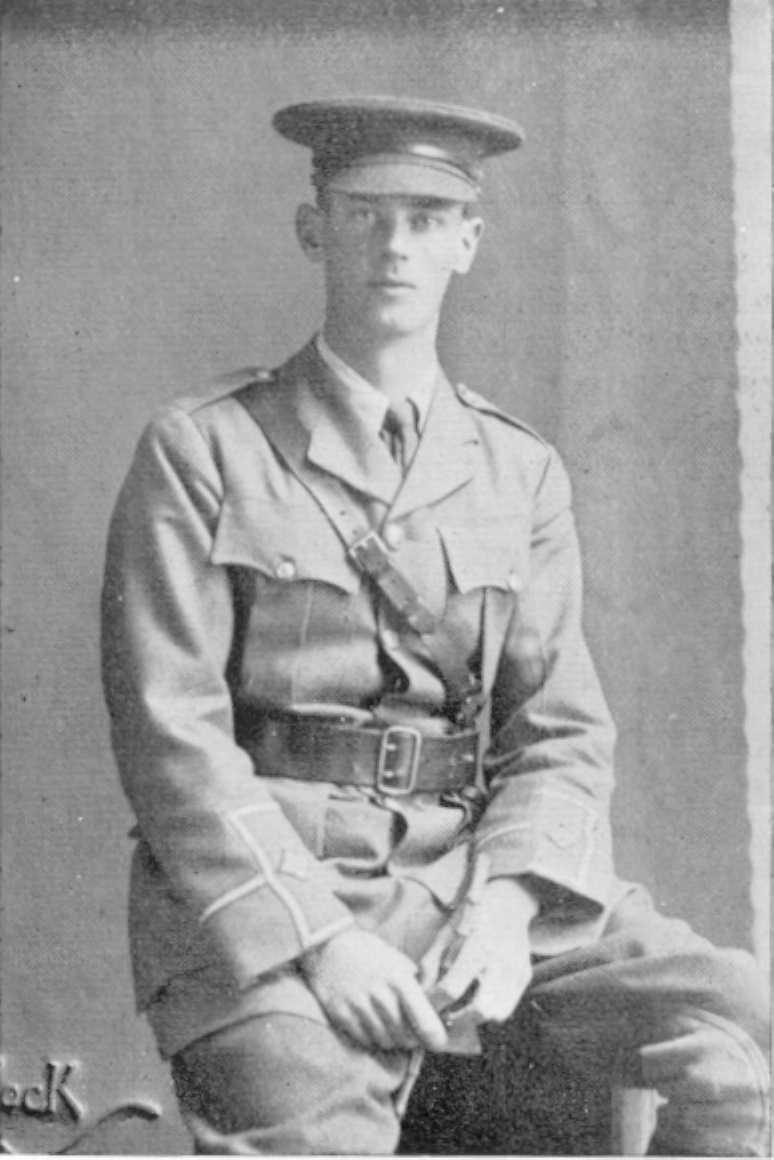
Lance Jennings

In 1915, MacCallum married Lance (Lancelot) Shadwell Jennings, and became known as Bella Jennings. Both were tennis champions and researchers. Captain Jennings was killed on 15 September 1916 at the Western Front, aged 23. In 1919, she married Peter MacCallum at St Giles' Cathedral in Edinburgh. She had three daughters from her second marriage.

== Career and research ==
In 1919, MacCallum moved to England, where she studied bacteriology at Cambridge Medical School, then moved to the University of Edinburgh, where she researched fungi, specifically timber staining fungi, publishing Some Wood-Staining Fungi in 1920. She was elected a Fellow of the Linnean Society in 1921. Less is known about her life after this point; she moved to Australia when husband Peter MacCallum was elected Chair of Pathology at Melbourne University, and died on 17 March 1927, giving birth to their third daughter, Bella.

In 2017, MacCallum featured as one of the Royal Society Te Apārangi's "150 women in 150 words" project, celebrating the contributions of women to knowledge in New Zealand.
