= Director-General of the World Health Organization =

Chief executive officer of the World Health Organization

- Logo of the World Health Organization

- Flag of the World Health Organization

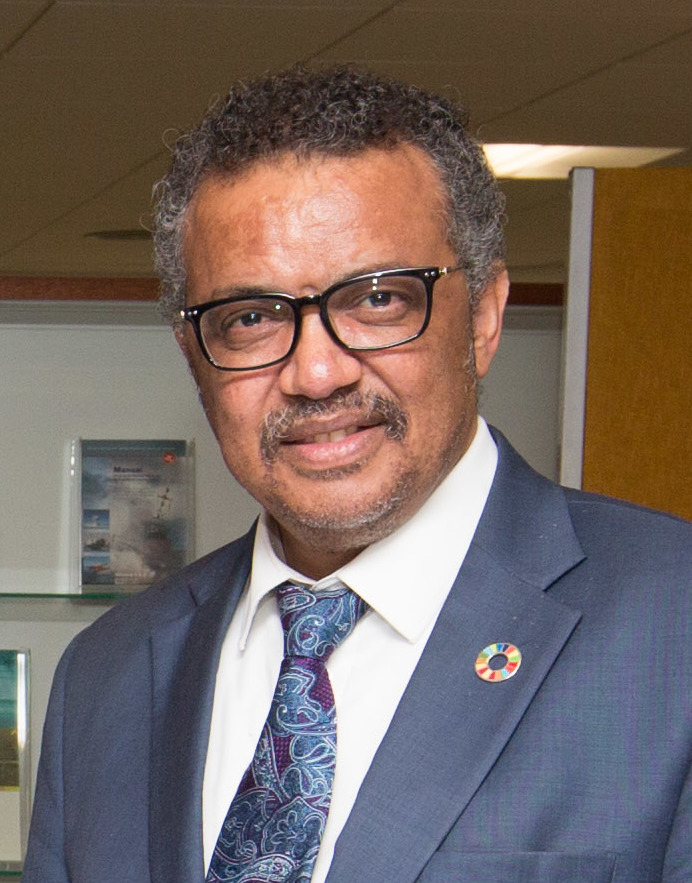
- Incumbent; Tedros Adhanom Ghebreyesus since 1 July 2017
- World Health Organization Secretariat
- Style: Honourable
- Type: Director-General
- Status: Head of World Health
- Member of: World Health Organization
- Reports to: World Health Assembly
- Nominator: Executive Board
- Appointer: World Health Assembly
- Term length: 5 years, renewable
- Formation: 7 April 1948; 78 years ago
- First holder: Brock Chisholm
- Deputy: Deputy Director-General

The director-general of the World Health Organization is the chief executive officer of the World Health Organization (WHO) and the principal advisor to the United Nations on matters pertaining to global health. The director general is elected by and answers to the World Health Assembly (WHA). The current director-general is Tedros Adhanom Ghebreyesus, who was appointed on 1 July 2017, and re-appointed on 24 May 2022. The director-general also leads the World Health Organization Secretariat and is also the ex officio secretary of the World Health Assembly, the World Health Organization Executive Board, and of all commissions and committees, and conferences convened by the organization.

== Selection process ==
Candidates for director-general can be proposed by Member States, then nominated by the executive board and appointed by the World Health Assembly.

The appointment process begins more than one year prior to the May vote, when the World Health Organization sends out a letter informing Member States that the nomination process has begun. The nomination period ends in mid-September, and candidates are announced at the end of October. If there are multiple candidates, the executive board of the World Health Organization – a panel of members from 34 member countries representing the various World Health Organization regions – interviews the nominees.

The term of the director-general lasts for five years. A director-general can be re-appointed only once. The director-general is typically appointed in May, when the World Health Assembly meets.

== List of directors-general of the World Health Organization ==
Denotes service as acting director

No.	Image	Nationality	Name	Tenure
1		Canada	Brock Chisholm	1948–1953
2		Brazil	Marcolino Gomes Candau	1953–1973
3		Denmark	Halfdan T. Mahler	1973–1988
4		Japan	Hiroshi Nakajima 中嶋 宏	1988–1998
5		Norway	Gro Harlem Brundtland	21 July 1998 – 28 January 2003
6		South Korea	Lee Jong-wook 이종욱	28 January 2003 – 23 May 2006
–		Sweden	Anders Nordström*	23 May 2006 – 9 November 2006
7		Hong Kong	Margaret Chan 陳馮富珍	9 November 2006 – 30 June 2017
8		Ethiopia	Tedros Adhanom Ghebreyesus ቴዎድሮስ አድሓኖም ገብረኢየሱስ	1 July 2017 – Incumbent
*Appointed acting Director-General following the death of Lee Jong-wook while in office
