= Margaret Chan =

Chinese-Canadian physician (born 1947)

Margaret Chan OBE JP FRCP
- 陳馮富珍
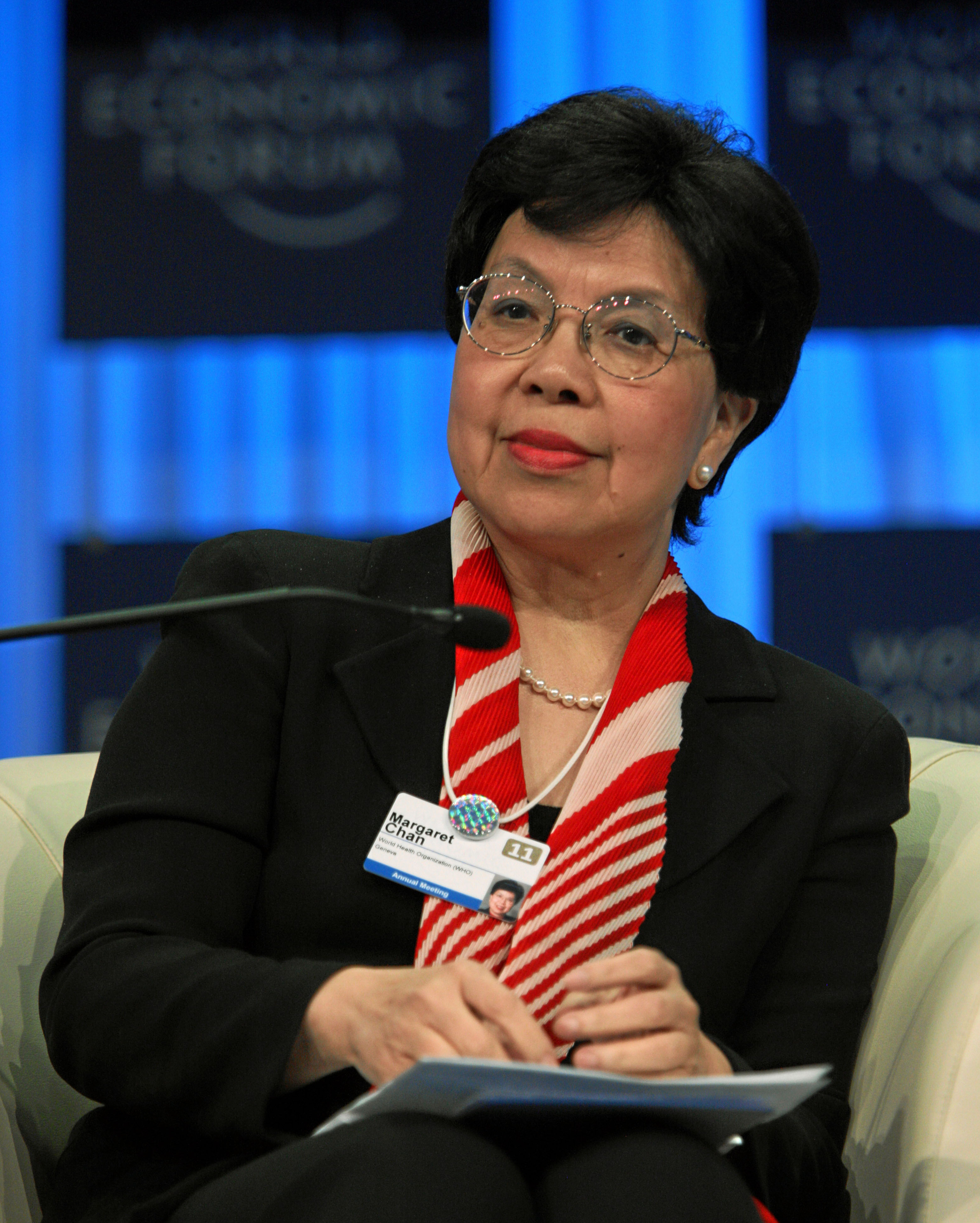
- Chan in 2011

7th Director-General of the World Health Organization
- In office 9 November 2006 – 1 July 2017
- Preceded by: Anders Nordström (acting)
- Succeeded by: Tedros Adhanom Ghebreyesus

4th Director of Health, Hong Kong
- In office 6 June 1994 – 20 August 2003
- Preceded by: Lee Shu-Hung
- Succeeded by: Lam Ping-Yan

Personal details
- Born: Margaret Fung Fu-chun; 21 August 1947 (age 79) British Hong Kong
- Spouse: David Chan
- Education: Northecote College of Education (Cert); University of Western Ontario (BA, MD); National University of Singapore (MS)

Margaret Chan
- Traditional Chinese: 陳馮富珍
- Simplified Chinese: 陈冯富珍
Transcriptions
Standard Mandarin
- Hanyu Pinyin: Chén-Féng Fùzhēn
Yue: Cantonese
- Jyutping: Can^{4} Fung^{4} Fu^{3} Zan^{1}

Margaret Chan Fung Fu-chun (born 21 August 1947) is a Chinese-Canadian physician and politician, who served as the Director-General of the World Health Organization (WHO) delegating the People's Republic of China from 2006 to 2017. Chan previously served as Director of Health in the Hong Kong Government (1994–2003) and representative of the WHO Director-General for Pandemic Influenza and WHO Assistant Director-General for Communicable Diseases (2003–2006). In 2014, Forbes ranked her as the 30th most powerful woman in the world. In early 2018 she joined the Chinese People's Political Consultative Conference (CPPCC).

She was widely criticized for her handling of the 1997 H5N1 avian influenza outbreak and the 2003 SARS outbreak in Hong Kong, and for her frequent travels while serving as Director-General of the WHO.

== Early life and education ==
Chan was born and raised in British Hong Kong. Her ancestors came from Shunde, Guangdong.

Chan received a professional degree for teaching home economics at the Northecote College of Education in Hong Kong. She received a bachelor of arts with a major in home economics in 1973 and a doctor of medicine in 1977 from the University of Western Ontario in Canada. She received a master of science (public health) from the National University of Singapore in 1985.

== Career ==
=== Early career ===
Chan joined the Government of British Hong Kong in December 1978 as a medical officer. In November 1989, she was promoted to assistant director of the Department of Health. In April 1992, she was promoted to deputy director and, in June 1994, was named the first woman in Hong Kong to head the Department of Health.

=== Director of Health in Hong Kong, 1994–2003 ===
Chan survived the transition from British to PRC-HKSAR rule in June 1997. Her profile was raised by her handling, in those positions, of the 1997 H5N1 avian influenza outbreak and the 2003 SARS outbreak in Hong Kong. After the first cases of the H5N1 died, Chan first tried to reassure Hong Kong residents with statements such as "I ate chicken last night" or "I eat chicken every day, don't panic, everyone". When many more H5N1 cases appeared, she was criticized for misleading the public. She became "a symbol of ignorance and arrogance epitomizing the mentality of 'business as usual' embedded in the ideological and institutional practices within the bureaucracy, especially after the hand-over." In the end, she was credited for helping bring the epidemic under control by the slaughter of 1.5 million chickens in the region in the face of stiff political opposition.

Her performance during the SARS outbreak, which ultimately led to 299 deaths, attracted harsh criticism from the Legislative Council of Hong Kong and many people with SARS and their relatives. She was criticised by the Legislative Council for her passiveness, for believing in misleading information shared by the mainland authority, and for not acting swiftly. She was also criticised for a lack of political wisdom was evident in her indifference to media reports and widespread public fear at that time. On the other hand, the SARS expert committee established by the HKSAR government to assess its handling of the crisis, opined that the failure was not Chan's fault, but due to the structure of Hong Kong's health care system, in which the separation of the hospital authority from the public health authority resulted in problems with data sharing.

=== Assistant to DGWHO ===
Chan left the Hong Kong Government in August 2003 after 25 years of service to join the World Health Organization. She could initially not take up a post of Assistant Director-General because the Chinese Government did not give its clearance. She was given the post of Director, Sustainable Development and Healthy Environment Department, until she could move on, in 2005, to the position of ADG. From 2003 until 2005, Chan served as the Representative of the World Health Organization Director-General for Pandemic Influenza and as Assistant Director-General for Communicable Diseases.

=== Director-General of WHO, 2006–2017 ===
Chan served two terms of five years apiece as Director-General of the WHO. Appointed to the post in November 2006, Chan's first term ran through to June 2012. In her appointment speech, Chan considered the "improvements in the health of the people of Africa and the health of women" to be the key performance indicator of WHO and she wants to focus WHO's attention on "the people in greatest need." On 18 January 2012, Chan was nominated by the WHO's executive board for a second term and was confirmed by the World Health Assembly on 23 May 2012. In her acceptance speech, Chan indicated that universal coverage is a "powerful equaliser" and the most powerful concept of public health. Chan's new term began on 1 July 2012 and continued until 30 June 2017.

==== First term ====
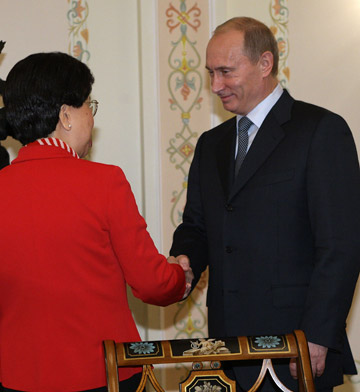
Margaret Chan and Russian Prime Minister Vladimir Putin in 2009

In February 2007, Chan provoked the anger of humanitarian and civil society groups including Doctors Without Borders by questioning the quality of generic medicines while on a visit to Thailand.

In 2010 Chan was criticised for "crying wolf" about the 2009 flu pandemic, which turned out to be much milder than expected.

After a visit to North Korea in April 2010, Chan said malnutrition was a problem in the country but that North Korea's health system would be the envy of many developing countries because of the abundance of medical staff. She also noted there were no signs of obesity in the country, which is a newly emerging problem in other parts of Asia. Chan's comments marked a significant departure from that of her predecessor, Gro Harlem Brundtland, who said in 2001 that North Korea's health system was near collapse. The director-general's assessment was criticised, including in a Wall Street Journal editorial which called her statements "surreal." The editorial further stated, "Ms. Chan is either winking at the reality to maintain contact with the North or she allowed herself to be fooled."

In 2011, because of financial constraints in donor countries the WHO slashed its budget by nearly $1 billion and cut 300 jobs at its headquarters under Chan's leadership.

==== Second term ====
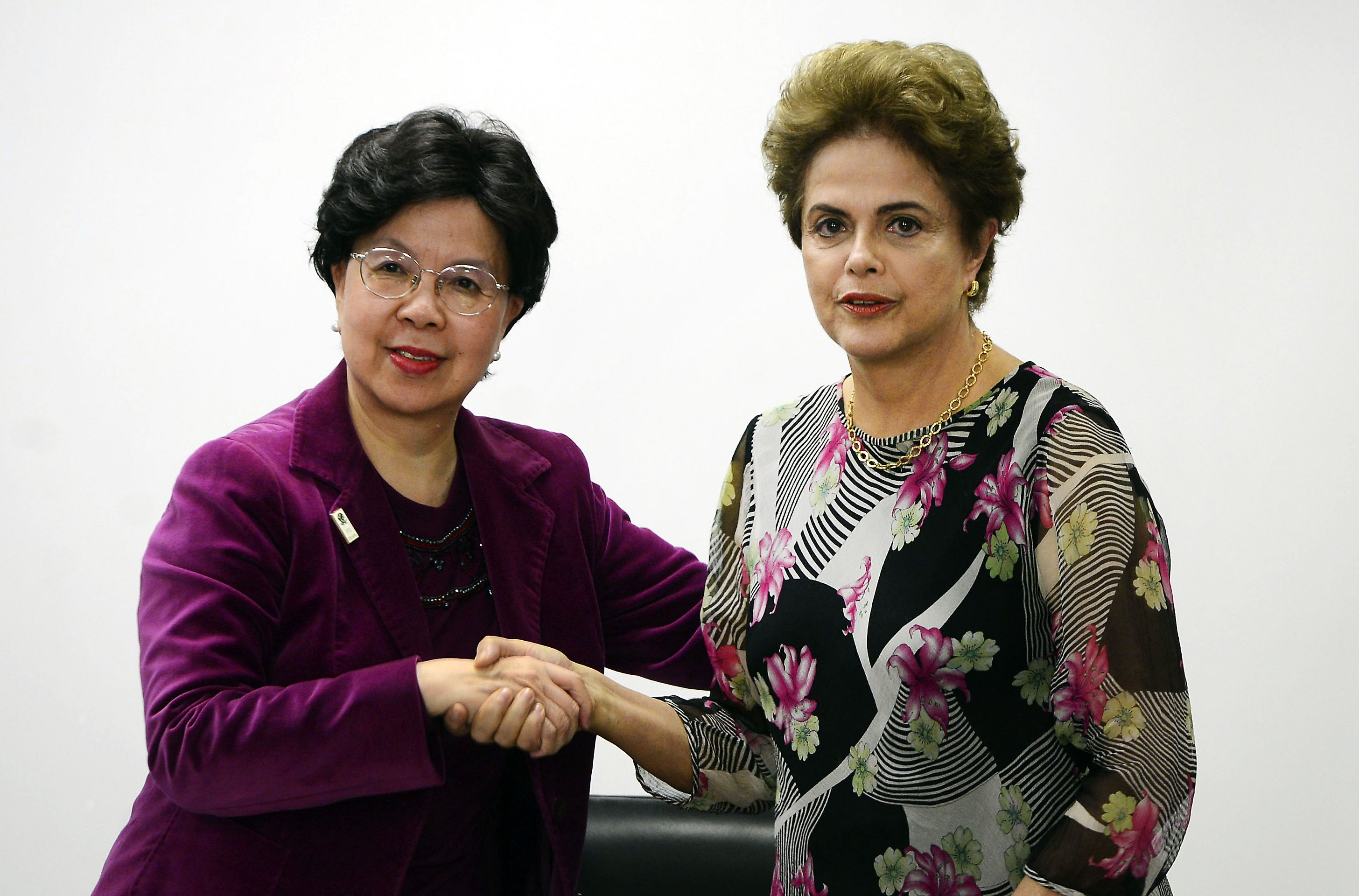
Margaret Chan with Brazilian President Dilma Rousseff in 2016

The WHO was accused of deferring to the Syrian government of President Bashar al-Assad when polio made a comeback in that country in late 2013.

In 2014 and 2015, Chan was again heavily criticised because of the slow response of the WHO to the Ebola virus epidemic in West Africa.

In 2016 at the request of the WHA, Chan launched the Health Emergencies Programme.

=== After WHO ===
In 2018, Chan joined the Task Force on Fiscal Policy for Health, a group convened by Michael R. Bloomberg and Lawrence H. Summers to address preventable leading causes of death and noncommunicable diseases through fiscal policy. The same year, she was appointed to the Council of Advisors of the Boao Forum for Asia.

In December 2021, during the 2021 Hong Kong legislative election, Chan said, of the election where only "patriots" could serve in the government, "The new election system is going to be very good for Hong Kong, for Hong Kong's long-term development, and for Hong Kong's democracy to take a step by step approach."

In August 2022, after Nancy Pelosi visited Taiwan, Chan said "As the No 3 figure in the US government, Pelosi visiting Taiwan on a US military plane is a gross interference in China's internal affairs, seriously undermining China's sovereignty and territorial integrity, wantonly trampling on the one-China principle, seriously threatening the peace and stability of the Taiwan Strait, and seriously damaging Sino-US relations."

== Other activities ==
- Exemplars in Global Health, Member of the Senior Advisory Board (since 2020)

== Recognition ==
In 1997, Chan was given the distinction for the Fellowship of the Faculty of Public Health Medicine of the Royal College of Physicians of the United Kingdom and was also appointed as an Officer of the Order of the British Empire by Queen Elizabeth II.

In 2014, Chan was ranked as the 30th most powerful woman in the world, based on her position as Director-General, by Forbes. Her ranking increased from 33rd in 2013.

== Personal life ==
Margaret Chan is married to David Chan, who is an ophthalmologist.

Positions in intergovernmental organisations
Preceded by Anders Nordström (Acting)	Director-General of the World Health Organization; 2007–2017	Succeeded by Tedros Adhanom Ghebreyesus
