= Brock Chisholm =

Canadian psychiatrist (1896–1971)

Brock Chisholm CC CBE MC ED
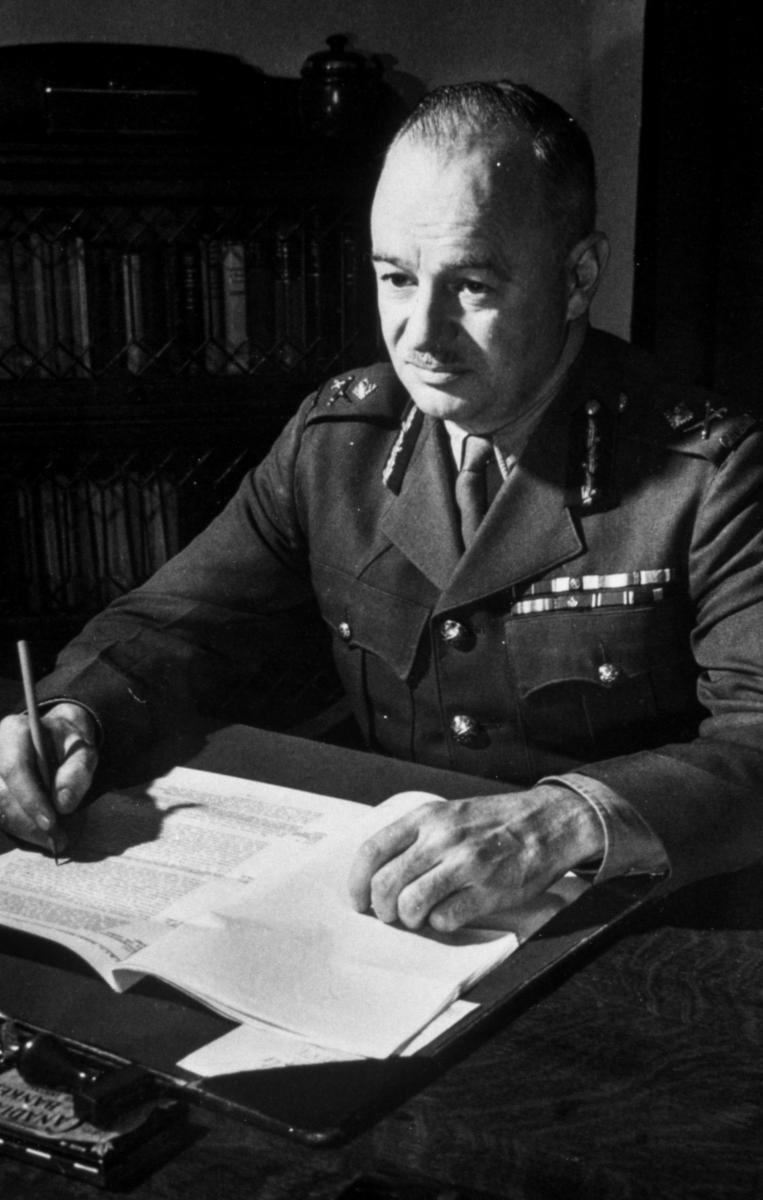
- Chisholm in 1950

First Director-General of the World Health Organization
- In office 1948–1953
- Preceded by: Position established
- Succeeded by: Marcolino Gomes Candau

Personal details
- Born: George Brock Chisholm; 18 May 1896 Oakville, Ontario, Canada
- Died: 4 February 1971 (aged 74) Victoria, British Columbia, Canada
- Spouse: Grace Ryrie Chisholm (m. 1924)
- Children: 2
- Education: University of Toronto (MD); Yale University

George Brock Chisholm CC CBE MC ED (18 May 1896 – 4 February 1971) was a Canadian psychiatrist, medical practitioner, World War I veteran, and the first director-general of the World Health Organization (WHO). He was the 13th Canadian Surgeon General and the recipient of numerous accolades, including Order of Canada, Order of the British Empire, Military Cross, and the military Efficiency Decoration.

== Background ==
Brock Chisholm was born on 18 May 1896, in Oakville, Ontario, to a family with deep ties to the region. Under Sir Isaac Brock, his great-grandfather fought against the Americans during the War of 1812. His great grandfather’s brother, William, was Oakville’s founder. His father was Frank Chisholm, who ran a coal yard. He had a Presbyterian upbringing.

== Career ==
=== Canada ===
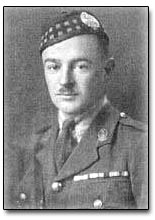
Chisholm as a captain in the Canadian Expeditionary Force at the end of World War I.

In 1915 during the First World War, age 18, Chisholm joined the Canadian Expeditionary Force, serving in the 15th Battalion, CEF as a cook, sniper, machine gunner and scout. His leadership and heroism were twice rewarded (after being twice wounded): with a Military Cross for his efforts in a battle outside of Lens, France; and the Bar. He rose to the rank of captain, was injured once, and returned home in 1917. The full citation for his Military Cross appeared in The London Gazette in March 1918 and reads as follows:

For conspicuous gallantry and devotion to duty. Throughout an attack he led his men with great skill and complete disregard of personal safety, and when the company on his left lost all its officers he went over to them and organised a defensive flank–one of the most difficult and important parts of the whole attack. Later in the day, he fearlessly led a party against an enemy counter-attack, which he broke up and repulsed with very heavy losses. He showed the greatest coolness and determination on this occasion.

His bar's citation:

During two attacks this officer led his platoon with great courage under very heavy fire, dressing the wounds of some of his men at great risk to himself, and when more than half of his men were casualties he disposed the remainder with great ability, and consolidated his position. He set a brilliant example to his men.

After the war, Chisholm pursued his lifelong passion of medicine, earning his MD from the University of Toronto by 1924 before interning in England, where he specialized in psychiatry. After six years in private practice in his native Oakville, he attended Yale University where he specialized in the mental health of children. During this time, Chisholm developed his strong view that children should be raised in an "as intellectually free environment" as possible, independent of the prejudices and biases (political, moral and religious) of their parents.

At the outbreak of the Second World War, Chisholm rapidly rose in stature within the Canadian military and government. He joined the war effort as a psychiatrist dealing with psychological aspects of soldier training, before rising to the rank of Director General Medical Services, the highest position within the medical ranks of the Canadian Army. He was the first psychiatrist to head the medical ranks of any army in the world.

In 1944, the Canadian Government created the position of Deputy Minister of Health. Chisholm was the first person to occupy the post and held it until 1946.

=== WHO ===
In 1946, Chisholm became executive secretary of the Interim Commission of the World Health Organization (WHO), based in Geneva, Switzerland. The WHO succeeded the League of Nations's Health Organization. Chishom was one of 16 international experts consulted in drafting the agency's first constitution. He recommended the WHO's name, with emphasis on "world." He defined health for the WHO as "a state of complete physical, mental, and social well-being and not merely the absence of disease or infirmity." The WHO charter also established that health is a fundamental human right and that "the health of all peoples is fundamental to the attainment of peace and security."

The WHO became a permanent UN fixture in April 1948, and Chisholm became the agency's first Director General on a 46–2 vote. Chisholm was now in the unique position of being able to bring his views on the importance of international mental and physical health to the world. Refusing re-election, he occupied the post until 1953, during which time the WHO dealt successfully with a cholera epidemic in Egypt, malaria outbreaks in Greece and Sardinia, and introduced shortwave epidemic-warning services for ships at sea.

=== Later career ===
Chisholm served as president of the World Federation of Mental Health (1957–58).

He was one of the signatories of the agreement to convene a convention for drafting a world constitution. As a result, for the first time in human history, a World Constituent Assembly convened to draft and adopt the Constitution for the Federation of Earth.

== Beliefs ==
Chisholm was a controversial public speaker who nevertheless spoke with great conviction, and drew much criticism from the Canadian public for comments in the mid-1940s that children should not be encouraged to believe in Santa Claus, the Bible or anything he regarded as supernaturalism. Calls for his resignation as Deputy Minister of Health were quelled by his appointment as Executive Secretary of the WHO, but his public perception as "Canada's most famously articulate angry man" lingered.

In February 1946, Chisholm spoke from the pulpit to the First Unitarian Congregation of Ottawa. At that time he was not a Unitarian, but he later became a member of the First Unitarian Church of Victoria and served as Moderator of the American Unitarian Association.

Five decades after his death, Chisholm's beliefs were still exciting controversy. In June 2024, a blogger analysed Chisholm's writings and career, coming to the conclusion that, although Chisholm may have been neither a declared Marxist nor a Communist, he had nonetheless "... been working diligently for a worldwide socialistic system... and we know socialism is just one of many forms of collectivism located in the same parking lot as Marxism." In April 2024, an internet fact-checker came to the conclusion that, although Chisholm wasn't the source of a widely-circulated quotation, this provocative sentence was nonetheless a valid summary of an article Chisholm had published in 1946 "barring the reference to 'individualism'". In their Facebook post, this fact-checker was highly critical of Chisholm's strongly-felt view "that 'morality' and the 'poisonous certainties' fed to us by our 'parents, Sunday school teachers, priests' and others should be thrown away in favor of SELF-directed 'intellectual freedom'."

== Marriage ==
On 21 June 1924, Chisholm married Grace McLean Ryrie. They had two children, Catherine Anne and Brock Ryrie.

== Death ==
On 4 February 1971, Chisholm died age 74 in Veterans' Hospital, Victoria, British Columbia, after a series of strokes.

== Honors, awards ==
Chisholm's honors and awards include:

- 1945: Medal of the Pasteur Institute
- 1953: Lasker Award
- 1957: Honorary President of the World Federalist Movement-Canada
- 1959: Humanist of the Year (American Humanist Association)
- 1967: Companion of the Order of Canada

He was an Honorary Fellow of the Royal Society of Medicine, of the American Psychiatric Association, and the American Public Health Association among others.

== Legacy ==
One reviewer of John Farley's biography lauded Chisholm's visionary ideas and asserted that "his worthy legacy does honor to Canada". Another reviewer asserted that "There were no tears, in Canada or anywhere else, when Chisholm announced his retirement at age 57 in 1953... Chisholm’s vision for the WHO was impractical and a failure. The organization evolved almost literally in spite of its director general."

At his death, the New York Times remembered Chisholm as a "small-town doctor who became director general of the World Health Organization" and also called him "Prophet of Disaster."

Historica Canada notes he was an early leader in warning about the "danger of pollution, overpopulation, and the nuclear arms race."

== Works ==
- Social responsibility, and three memorial papers by Gordon W. Allport (New York: Association Press, 1948)
- World health problems. Barriers to world health (New York: Carnegie Endowment for International Peace, 1953)
- Nations are learning to live together (Vancouver: University of British Columbia, 1954)
- Prescription for survival (New York: Columbia University Press, 1957)
- Can people learn to learn? How to know each other (New York: Harper, 1958)

== See also ==
- World Health Organization (WHO)
- Surgeon General (Canada)
- List of books, articles and documentaries about snipers

Positions in intergovernmental organisations
Preceded by None (First in office)	Director-General of the World Health Organization; 1948–1953	Succeeded by Marcolino Gomes Candau
