= Halfdan T. Mahler =

Danish physician (1923–2016)

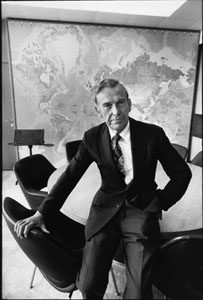

3rd Director-General of the World Health Organization
- In office 1973–1988
- Preceded by: Marcolino Gomes Candau
- Succeeded by: Hiroshi Nakajima

Personal details
- Born: Halfdan Theodor Mahler; 21 April 1923 Vivild, Denmark
- Died: 14 December 2016 (aged 93) Geneva, Switzerland
- Education: University of Copenhagen

Halfdan Theodor Mahler (21 April 1923 – 14 December 2016) was a Danish physician. He served three terms as Director-General of the World Health Organization (WHO) from 1973 to 1988, and is widely known for his effort to combat tuberculosis and his role in having shaped the landmark Alma Ata Declaration that defined the Health for All by the Year 2000 strategy.

== Biography ==
Mahler was born in Vivild, Denmark, in 1923, the last of seven children. Eschewing a career as a preacher, Mahler studied medicine at the University of Copenhagen (1948). Building on his postgraduate work in public health, his first international activities were in tuberculosis and community work in under-developed countries. He directed a Red Cross antituberculosis campaign in Ecuador between 1950 and 1951.

In 1951, Mahler joined the World Health Organization (WHO) and spent almost ten years in India as Senior WHO Officer attached to the National Tuberculosis Programme. From 1962, he was Chief of the Tuberculosis Unit at the WHO Headquarters in Geneva until 1969, when he was appointed Director, Project Systems Analysis. From the late 1960s, under Mahler's lead, the WHO projects related to the development of "basic health services" were increased; these projects were the institutional predecessors of the primary health care programs that would later appear. In 1970, he was made Assistant Director-General of WHO while retaining the direction of Project Systems Analysis.

Mahler was elected WHO's third Director-General in 1973. In the same year, the Executive Board of WHO issued the report "Organizational Study on Methods of Promoting the Development of Basic Health Services". Mahler established a close rapport with Henry Labouisse. The agreement produced in 1975 a joint WHO–UNICEF report, Alternative Approaches to Meeting Basic Health Needs in Developing Countries, which examined successful primary health care in various countries. This report also criticized the idea of vertical approach methods of focusing on specific diseases as well as adding Western approaches to developing countries. The result of this report led WHO to re-construct their approaches to Primary Health Care, which led to a worldwide debate.

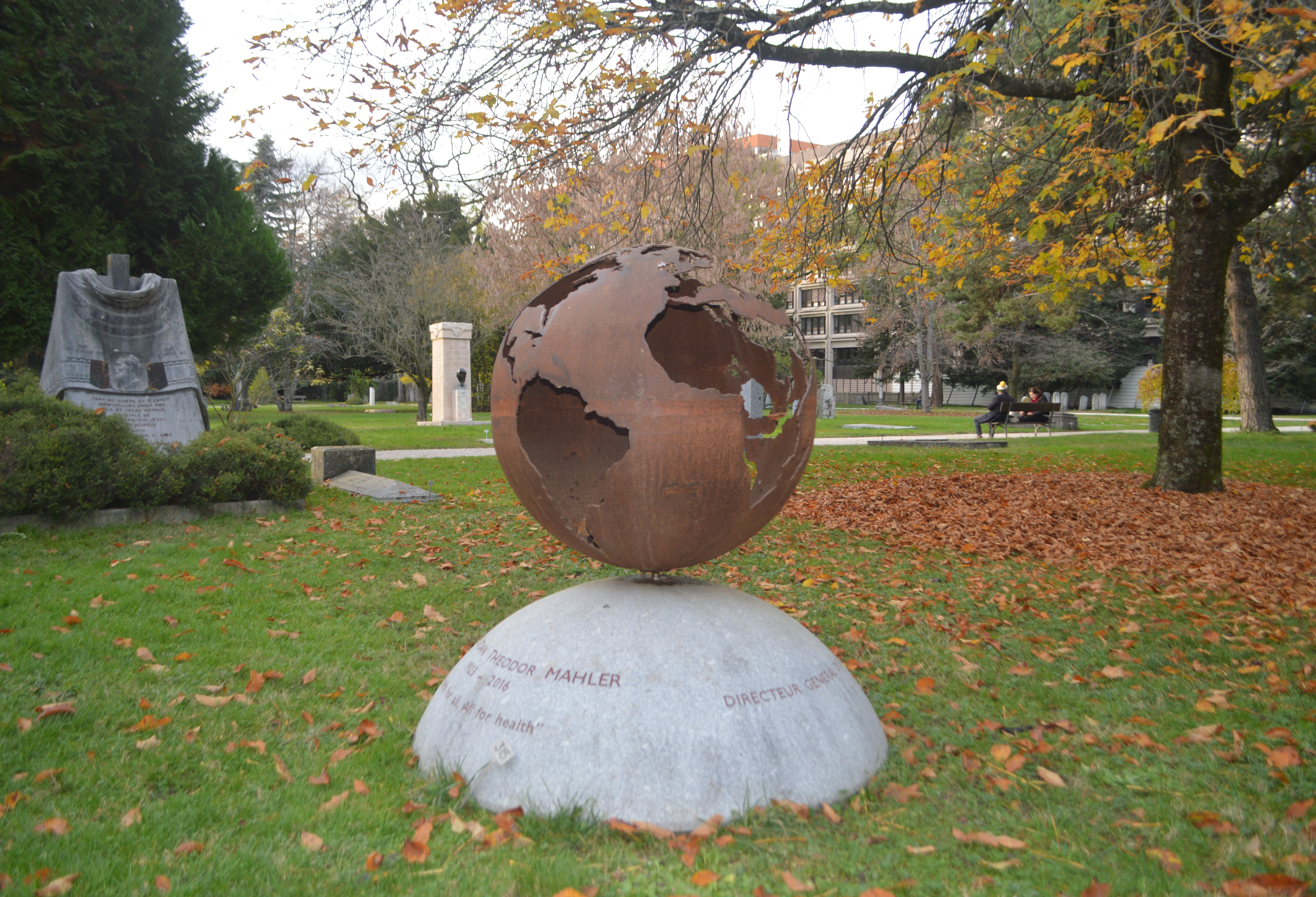
Mahler's grave in Geneva

Mahler delivered a speech at the 1976 World Health assembly describing weakening social structures and launching his Health for all by 2000 goal. He was re-elected for two successive five-year terms in 1978 and 1983. Under Mahler, in 1979, the Thirty-second World Health Assembly launched the Global Strategy for Health for All by the Year 2000. Mahler's "Health for All by the Year 2000" was criticized for being too broad and idealistic, and with the changing political climate of the 1980s health care began to move towards more selective and cost-efficient approaches. Mahler was left to champion a more holistic and inclusive approach to health care on his own and with his departure as the Director-General, the WHO lost its political profile. During the 1980s AIDS epidemic, he acknowledged that WHO were slow to respond to the spread of the disease.

After leaving WHO, Mahler became director of the International Planned Parenthood Federation. He left the role in 1995. Mahler died in Geneva on 14 December 2016 at the age of 93. He is buried at the Cimetière des Rois in Geneva. His tombstone bears the quote:

"Health for all. All for health"

Positions in intergovernmental organisations
Preceded by Marcolino Gomes Candau	Director-General of the World Health Organization; 1973–1988	Succeeded by Hiroshi Nakajima
