= Mycolactone =

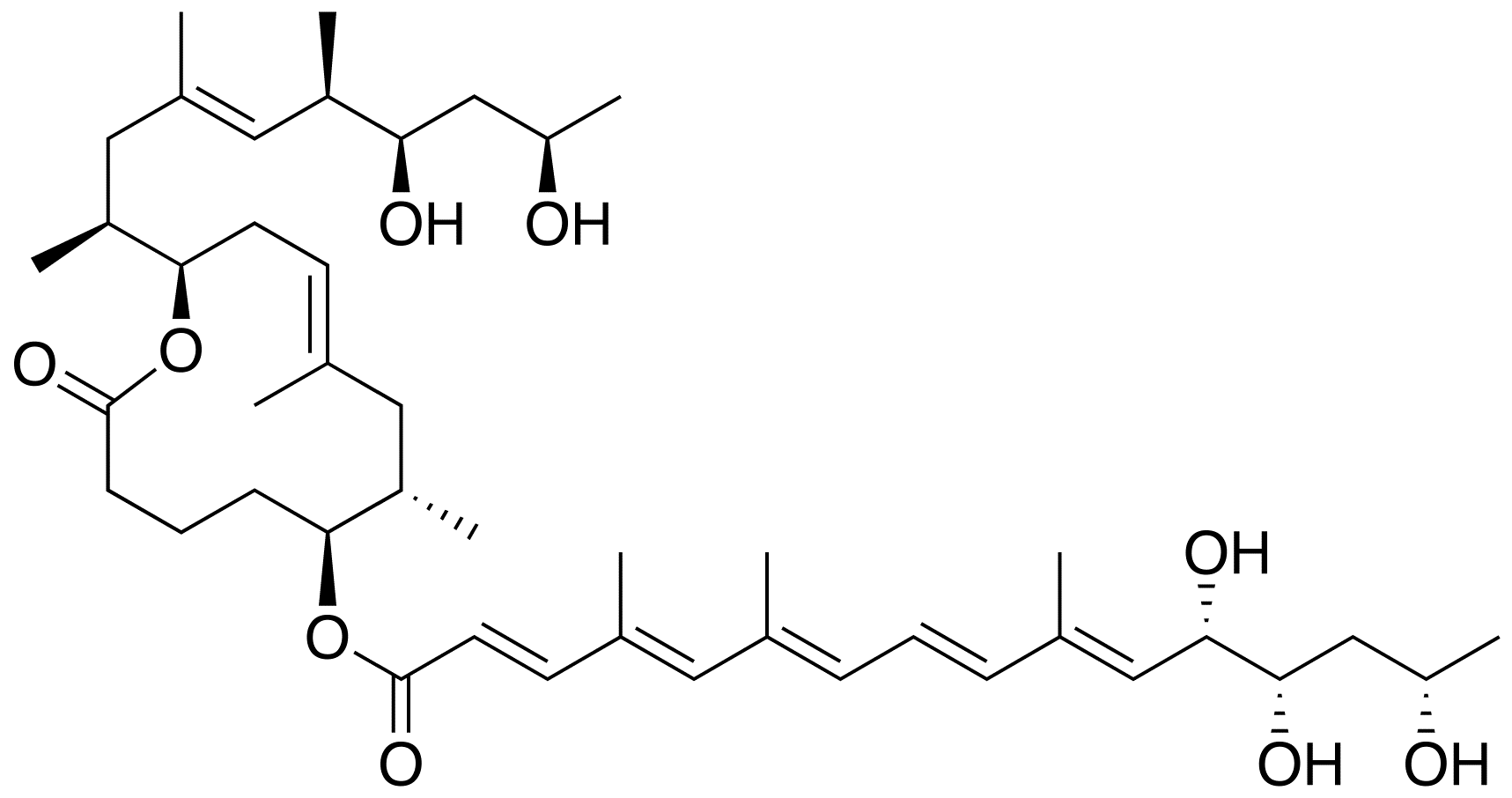

Names
- Preferred IUPAC name (6S,7S,9E,12R)-12-[(2S,4E,6R,7R,9R)-7,9-Dihydroxy-4,6-dimethyldec-4-en-2-yl]-7,9-dimethyl-2-oxo-1-oxacyclododec-9-en-6-yl (2E,4E,6E,8E,10E,12S,13S,15S)-12,13,15-trihydroxy-4,6,10-trimethylhexadeca-2,4,6,8,10-pentaenoate

Identifiers
CAS Number	222050-77-3
3D model (JSmol)	Interactive image
ChemSpider	4445303
MeSH	Mycolactone
PubChem CID	5282079
CompTox Dashboard (EPA)	DTXSID10415207
- InChI: InChI=1S/C44H70O9/c1-28(13-11-14-29(2)25-39(48)40(49)27-37(10)46)21-30(3)18-20-44(51)52-41-15-12-16-43(50)53-42(19-17-31(4)22-34(41)7)35(8)24-32(5)23-33(6)38(47)26-36(9)45/h11,13-14,17-18,20-21,23,25,33-42,45-49H,12,15-16,19,22,24,26-27H2,1-10H3/b14-11+,20-18+,28-13+,29-25+,30-21+,31-17+,32-23+/t33-,34+,35+,36-,37+,38-,39+,40+,41+,42-/m1/s1 Key: WKTLNJXZVDLRTJ-QRRXZRELSA-N; InChI=1/C44H70O9/c1-28(13-11-14-29(2)25-39(48)40(49)27-37(10)46)21-30(3)18-20-44(51)52-41-15-12-16-43(50)53-42(19-17-31(4)22-34(41)7)35(8)24-32(5)23-33(6)38(47)26-36(9)45/h11,13-14,17-18,20-21,23,25,33-42,45-49H,12,15-16,19,22,24,26-27H2,1-10H3/b14-11+,20-18+,28-13+,29-25+,30-21+,31-17+,32-23+/t33-,34+,35+,36-,37+,38-,39+,40+,41+,42-/m1/s1 Key: WKTLNJXZVDLRTJ-QRRXZRELBE
- SMILES: O=C1O[C@H](C/C=C(/C[C@@H]([C@@H](OC(=O)\C=C\C(=C\C(=C\C=C\C(=C\[C@H](O)[C@@H](O)C[C@@H](O)C)C)C)C)CCC1)C)C)[C@@H](C)CC(=C/[C@@H](C)[C@H](O)C[C@H](O)C)/C

Properties
Chemical formula	C_{44}H_{70}O_{9}
Molar mass	743.021
- Except where otherwise noted, data are given for materials in their standard state (at 25 °C [77 °F], 100 kPa). verify (what is ?) Infobox references

Mycolactone is a polyketide-derived macrolide produced and secreted by a group of very closely related pathogenic mycobacteria species including M. ulcerans, M. liflandii (an unofficial designation), M. pseudoshottsii, and some strains of M. marinum. These mycobacteria are collectively referred to as mycolactone-producing mycobacteria or MPM.

In humans, mycolactone is the toxin responsible for Buruli ulcers, doing so by damaging tissues and inhibiting the immune response.

== History ==
=== Early observations ===
In the 1960s, pathologists studying Buruli ulcer in Uganda noted extensive tissue necrosis with very little inflammation extending beyond bacterial clusters, suggesting secretion of a diffusible cytotoxin by Mycobacterium ulcerans.

=== Discovery and characterization ===
In 1999, George and colleagues purified this factor from alcohol-soluble lipids and identified a 12-membered macrolactone with two polyketide side chains, naming it mycolactone (from its mycobacterial origin and macrolactone structure). It was the first polyketide macrolide isolated from a mycobacterium and the first identified polyketide virulence factor of a human pathogen. In 2002, the total synthesis of the molecule was done by Song et al. and enabled the creation of synthetic variants for laboratory study.

=== Evolving understanding (2000s - Present) ===
Research in the early 2000s identified that the genetic instructions for mycolactone reside on a giant virulence plasmid, pMUM001. Researchers also discovered that naturally occurring mycolactone consists of several structural variants, primarily isomers A and B (Z/E at C4′–C5′), with absolute stereochemistry confirmed by total synthesis.

Subsequent studies identified additional congeners (C–F and beyond) from strains of different geographic origins. Comparative genomics later showed all mycolactone producing mycobacteria derive from a common M. marinum like ancestor, now regarded as ecovars of M. ulcerans.

The functional understanding of mycolactone shifted significantly in the 2010s. While initially viewed strictly as a necrotizing agent, it was discovered to be a potent inhibitor of the Sec61 translocon. By blocking this gateway, mycolactone prevents cells from translocating proteins into the endoplasmic reticulum, effectively "silencing" the host's immune signaling and contributing to the characteristic lack of pain (analgesia) in early lesions. More recently, in the 2010s and 2020s, this deep mechanistic knowledge has been translated into clinical tools. Researchers have developed highly sensitive diagnostic tests for Buruli ulcer and are even exploring modified, non-toxic versions of mycolactone as potential anti-inflammatory or pain-relief drugs.

== Structure and reactivity ==
=== Molecular Architecture ===
Mycolactone is a polyketide-derived lipid-like macrolide toxin. Its gross structure is composed of three distinct sectors:

- The Macrolactone Core: A conserved 12-membered macrocyclic lactone ring (C1–C11).
- The Northern Side Chain: A short, invariant chain linked "core extension" comprising carbons C12–C20.
- The Southern Side Chain: A long, oxygen-linked (C5-O-linked) polyunsaturated fatty acid fragment (C1'–C16').

The "extended core" refers to the entire C1–C20 segment (with the carbonyl carbon of the lactone ester group as C1), while the southern side chain is a sensitive structure containing multiple double bonds and three stereogenic centers at C12', C13', and C15'.

=== Isomerism and Stereochemistry ===
Naturally occurring mycolactone does not exist as a single static molecule. Instead, it forms as a dynamic 3:2 mixture of two geometric isomers: mycolactone A (the Z-isomer) and mycolactone B (the E-isomer). These isomers differ only in the configuration of the double bond at the C4'–C5' position of the southern side chain. While they exist in equilibrium, synthetic studies suggest that the B analog is significantly more cytotoxic, potentially serving as the primary virulence factor.

=== Physical Properties and Stability ===
Due to its hydrophobic backbone and polar hydroxyl groups, mycolactone is amphiphilic, exhibiting surfactant-like and micelle-forming behavior in water. This structure gives it a high affinity for embedding itself into cellular membranes, where it disturbs lipid organization. The molecule is also highly unstable and sensitive to environmental factors: it is prone to photodegradation upon UV light exposure, it can thermally decompose even at –20 °C, and its central ester bond is easily broken down by metabolic processes.

=== Structure-Activity Relationship (SAR) ===
Extensive studies of total synthesis have identified how structural modifications affect the toxin's biological potency. Collectively, pruning or simplifying the side chains in any significant way is generally unfavorable for biological activity. While the northern chain allows for some functionalization, such as the attachment of laboratory tracking tags (such as fluorescent dyes or biotin), the southern side chain remains the primary driver of mycolactone's cytotoxic and immunosuppressive effects.

Structural component	Impact on toxicity and activity
Southern chain	Critical. Its absence reduces cytotoxicity by 10^{4}-fold. Deletion of the polyunsaturated system renders the molecule inactive.
C12' & C15' Hydroxyls	Essential. Removal or alteration of the spatial orientation of these hydroxyl groups drastically reduces cytopathogenicity.
Northern Chain	Tolerant. Modifications or extensions at C20 are relatively well-tolerated without significant loss of cytotoxicity.
Lactone Core	Conserved. Specific parts, like the C8-methyl group, are vital; removing it causes a 125-fold drop in activity.
Saturation/Acetylation	Inhibitory. Full hydrogenation of double bonds or acetylation of hydroxyl groups eliminates its cytotoxicity.

== Variants ==
Five distinct, naturally occurring mycolactone structural variants have been described so far:

- Mycolactone A/B (M. ulcerans from Africa, Malaysia, Japan)
- Mycolactone C (M. ulcerans from Australia)
- Mycolactone D (M. ulcerans from China)
- Mycolactone E (M. liflandii from Sub-Saharan Africa)
- Mycolactone F (M. pseudoshottsii and M. marinum from around the world)
- Mycolactone S1 and S2 (M. ulcerans from Africa, Malaysia, Japan)

== Synthesis ==
The production of mycolactone is studied through two lenses: biosynthesis, the natural process by which M. ulcerans assembles the toxin, and chemical synthesis, the laboratory methods developed by scientists to create pure samples for research.

=== Biosynthesis ===
Mycolactone is produced by a specialized genetic "factory" located on the giant plasmid pMUM001. The synthesis is driven by Type I modular polyketide synthases (PKS). These are massive multi-domain enzymes (named MLSA1, MLSA2, and MLSB) that act like a molecular assembly line (5,13).

- MLSA1 and MLSA2 are responsible for building the 12-membered macrolactone core and the "northern" side chain (C1–C20 fragment).
- MLSB simultaneously assembles the long, polyunsaturated "southern" acyl side chain.

As shown in Figure 1, MLSB (1.2 MDa) contains seven consecutive extension modules and MLSA 1 (1.8 MDa) consists of eight. The remaining PKS enzyme, MLSA 2, contains the ninth module of MLSA. The C-terminal domains of both MLSA2 and MLSB includes a thioesterase (TE) that was thought to catalyze the formation of the mycolactone core but appears inactive.

Each module within this PKS complex is responsible for a specific stage of the molecule's growth. It consists of an acyltransferase (AT) that selects a chemical building block (typically malonyl or methylmalonyl units), a ketosynthase (KS) which catalyzez chain elongation via a Claisen-type carbon-carbon bond, and an acyl carrier protein (ACP) where the growing polyketide chain is attached. Following this assembly, the module can further sculpt the molecule through a series of optional chemical reductions using modifying domains (Type A and B KRs refer to the two directions of ketoreduction).Four of the DH domains are predicted to be inactive based on a point mutation found in the active site sequence.

To finish the assembly, an esterase links the southern side chain to the core, and a P450 hydroxylase adds a critical oxygen atom at the C12' position. Different strains of the bacteria can recombine modules within the MLSB gene. This genetic shuffling creates six or more structural variants of mycolactone with significantly altered biological activity.

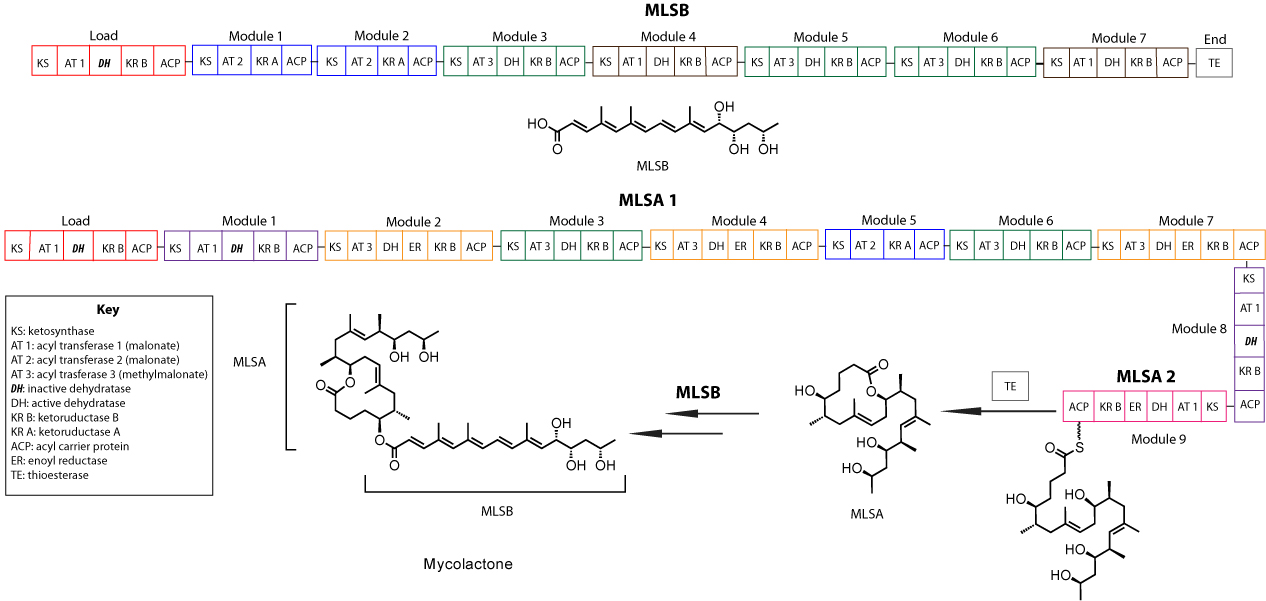
Domain organization of mycolactone.

Figure 1. Domain Organization of Mycolactone.

=== Chemical Synthesis ===
Because M. ulcerans grows very slowly and produces only minute amounts of toxin, chemists must build mycolactone from scratch to provide enough material for biological studies. Most synthetic work targets mycolactone A/B, as it is the primary toxin responsible for the severe West African strains of Buruli ulcer.

The laboratory synthesis is generally performed in a modular fashion, preparing the core and the two side chains as three separate building blocks. The Kishi group pioneered this effort, evolving their strategy through three main generations between 2001 and 2010. Their initial route aimed simply to confirm the exact 3D shape of the natural molecule, utilizing palladium-catalyzed Negishi coupling reactions with a low overall yield (~1.3%). Subsequent generations became highly convergent, utilizing better protecting groups to scale up efficiency. By their third generation, the team achieved a ~19% overall yield, allowing for the production of multigram quantities of high-purity toxin.

In all major synthetic routes, including all Kishi generations, the sensitive southern side chain is prepared separately and attached to the core at the very end via Yamaguchi esterification, followed by the removal of all chemical masks to produce the final active toxin.

Alternative Methods: While Kishi used macrolactonization to close the central ring, other prominent research groups (like Burkart and Altmann) have successfully used a chemical reaction called ring-closing metathesis (RCM) to "snap" the 12-membered core together.

== Mechanism of Action ==
Skin ulceration, host immunomodulation or analgesia are among the biological effects associated with mycolactone. Researchers have been studying inhibition of the WASP and related neural N-WASP, inhibition of Sec61- dependent translocation of proteins into the endoplasmic reticulum (ER) and inhibition of angiotensin II type 2 receptor (AT2R) to unfold its distinctive inhibitory mechanisms.

Its cytotoxicity focuses essentially on targeting and inhibiting the Sec61 translocon. Normally, synthesized secretory and membrane proteins in the cytoplasm enter the ER for folding and transport as well as initiate glycosylation. Contranslational translocation is regulated by the Sec61 translocon. Thus, when mycolactone binds to the alpha subunit of Sec61, it inhibits the translocon and prevents translocation of secreted proteins; driving them to the cytosol where they would be degraded by the ubiquitin–proteasome system (a process that ultimately triggers cellular stress, immunosuppression, and cell death, apoptosis).

Cellular Ca^{2+} homeostasis is also affected, leaking these cations between the endoplasmic reticulum and cytosol. Under normal conditions, the endoplasmatic reticulum acts as a reservoir of Ca^{2+}, having high concentration of this ion in its interior due to the equilibrium between two processes: passive discharge of Ca^{2+} through escape channels and recapture by SERCA pumps. By blocking Sec61 channel, it gets confined in a state permeable to Ca^{2+} which increases the output of these ions from the endoplasmic reticulum towards the cytosol. This increase in leakage causes a progressive reduction of the Ca^{2+} stored in the ER. Altogether, alteration of Ca^{2+} homeostasis contributes to the toxic effects of mycolactone, including cellular stress and cell death.

Furthermore, proteins that cannot enter the endoplasmic reticulum are kept being poorly located enhancing cell stress. As a response, cells activate autophagy. The toxin increases various autophagy markers, such as LC3B-II or ubiquitin. Finally, this autophagy activation is controlled by the integrated stress response (ISR) and does not require the protein ULK1, indicating that mycolactone behaves as an alternative route of autophagy. Moreover, the WASP (Wiskott–Aldrich Syndrome Protein) and N-WASP have been identified as molecular targets of mycolactone. These proteins arise from a family of scaffold proteins that regulate the dynamic remodeling of the actin cytoskeleton. Destruction of skin tissue provoked by mycolactone and the analgesic effect of Buruli ulcer are associated with hyperactivation of the neuronal isoform N-WASP.

Another inhibition is the mTOR, which are responsible for the regulation and control of cell growth, metabolism, cell proliferation and survival of several cell processes including apoptosis. Mycolactone binds to mTORC2 complex disrupting cell survival and growth signaling pathways.

== Metabolism ==
=== Distribution and Transport ===
Mycolactone is not found freely in the aqueous environment of the blood due to its hydrophobic characteristics. Instead, it is associated with plasma lipid carriers such as albumin, HDL (high-density lipoproteins) and LDL (low-density lipoproteins), which facilitate its transport and which are required for both solubilization and regulation of its bioavailability.

Mycolactone can travel to two distinct places in the blood. A large part stays in blood bonded to the lipid carriers or transported by immune cells. Following production in skin lesions, mycolactone diffuses from the bacterial clusters and enters the bloodstream.

=== Pharmacokinetics ===
Although very little is currently known regarding the classical host "metabolism" (Phase I/II biotransformation) of mycolactone. It is known that via passive diffusion mycolactone is driven across cellular membranes. While mycolactone can partition directly into lipid bilayers due to its surfactant-like properties, this scavenger receptor has been identified as a key contributor to its import into mammalian cells. Once at the plasma membrane, the toxin inserts into the bilayer, where it can reshape membrane architecture and alter cholesterol-dependent microdomains.

=== Biotransformation ===
While many mycotoxins undergo standard host biotransformations such as hydroxylation, glucuronidation, or sulfation, such metabolites have not yet been experimentally identified for mycolactone in human or animal models. The only confirmed enzymatic modifications of the molecule occur within the bacterium itself.

=== Persistence and Clearance ===
In clinical settings, the toxin remains detectable in ulcer exudates even after the successful completion of antibiotic therapy and the death of the M. ulcerans bacilli. Similarly, in cell culture experiments, the suppressive effects on cytokines remain evident for 24–48 hours after the toxin has been washed out of the medium. This suggests a very slow turnover rate in vivo, likely due to strong partitioning into tissue lipids or slow dissociation from its cellular targets. However, the exact pathways for systemic clearance remain uncharacterized.

== Indications ==
=== Buruli ulcer ===
Mycolactone acts as the central driver of Buruli ulcer (BU) pathology, creating an impact in tissue necrosis and immunosuppression. It creates widespread coagulative necrosis and fibrin deposition, damaging cell functions by depleting the anticoagulant receptor thrombomodulin and vessel basement membranes, leading to increased vascular permeability and skin necrosis.

=== Analgesia ===
The toxin also possesses an analgesic effect demonstrated in animals' models. It reduces the sensibility to feel pain by inhibiting neuronal signaling.

=== Anticancer activity ===
Mycolactone affects multiple myeloma cells by disrupting the secretion and expression of proteins. In fact, the toxin inhibits the expression of survival receptors such as IL-6 or CD40 (important for tumor growth) and production of immunoglobulins. Blocking Sec61 favors anticancer therapy as it causes selective apoptosis in tumor cells.

=== Immunosuppressive ===
In immune cells such as T lymphocytes, cytokine production and antigen responses are blocked by mycolactone. Cell signaling is distorted due to different factors such as activation of Src-family kinase, Lck, depletion of intracellular calcium stores, and downregulation of the T cell receptor. Mycolactone inhibits cytokines fabrication usually induced during Th1 (T helpers) T-cell activation at non cytotoxic concentrations. This inhibition occurs post-transcriptionally, meaning that cytokine gene transcription still occurs but proteins are not properly produced.
