= Hiroshi Nakajima =

Japanese physician (1928–2013)

- 中嶋 宏
- Nakajima in 1995

4th Director-General of the World Health Organization
- In office 1988–1998
- Secretary General: Javier Pérez de Cuéllar (1982–1991); Boutros Boutros-Ghali (1992–1996); Kofi Annan (1997–1998)
- Preceded by: Halfdan T. Mahler
- Succeeded by: Gro Harlem Brundtland

Personal details
- Born: May 16, 1928 Chiba, Empire of Japan
- Died: January 26, 2013 (aged 84) Poitiers, France
- Education: Tokyo Medical University (MD); International University of Health and Welfare (PhD)

Hiroshi Nakajima (中嶋 宏, Nakajima Hiroshi; May 16, 1928 – January 26, 2013) was a Japanese doctor known chiefly for his tenure as Director-General of the World Health Organization.

== Early life and education ==
He was born in Chiba, Japan, on 16 May 1928.

In 1955 Nakajima received his M.D. from Tokyo Medical University, Japan. He then studied in Paris.

At some point after 1967, he obtained a PhD in medical sciences in Japan.

== Professional life ==
=== Before 1974: France and Japan ===
From 1956 or 1958 to 1967 Nakajima worked at the French National Institute of Health and Medical Research doing medical and pharmaceutical research. After his stay in France, he returned to Japan and became research director of Nippon Roche, a Japanese subsidiary of Hoffmann-La Roche.

=== Early work at WHO ===
Nakajima joined WHO in 1974 in the position of Scientist, Drug Evaluation and Monitoring. In 1976, he became Chief of the WHO Drug Policies and Management Unit. It was in this position that he played a key role in developing the concept of essential drugs, as Secretary of the first Expert Committee on the subject.

In 1978 or 1979, the WHO Regional Committee for the Western Pacific nominated and elected Nakajima as Regional Director, an office he held for two consecutive terms until 1988 when he was elected Director-General of WHO.

=== 1988–1993: First term as Director-General of WHO ===
In January 1988 the WHO executive board selected Nakajima to become Director-General in a 17-to-14 vote over Carlyle Guerra de Macedo of Brazil.

During his leadership at WHO he notoriously had a conflict with then head of the WHO's Global Programme on AIDS (GPA), Jonathan Mann, which resulted in Mann's resignation. Mann thought Nakajima was not aggressive enough in his approach against AIDS. Much of the success of the Global Programme on AIDS was attributed to Mann, who also had autonomy over the Global Programme on AIDS, which Nakajima wanted to take away. Nakajima also limited Mann's budget and travel. Following Mann's resignation, the number of GPA staff dropped from more than 250 to four. This conflict and its impact on WHO's AIDS efforts has been documented as a part of the PBS Frontline documentary "The age of AIDS".

During his tenure, Nakajima was also accused of being a poor communicator and administrator.

During his first term in 1988, the Global Polio Eradication Initiative was launched.

=== 1993–1998: Second term as Director-General of WHO ===
In May 1993, Nakajima was re-elected in a 93-to-58 vote to a second term of office as Director-General. His re-election was opposed by all major donor countries to the WHO including the United States. There was controversy surrounding this re-election because the WHO awarded contracts to executive board members prior to the vote by the executive board in January. An audit was conducted that concluded in March and cleared Nakajima of misusing WHO's finances. Nakajima ran against Mohammed Abdelmoumène, an Algerian neurologist and Nakajima's deputy who had been fired by Nakajima in August 1992 for "disloyalty".

In 1997, Nakajima announced that he was not seeking another re-election and that his term of office would end in July 1998. He was replaced by Gro Harlem Brundtland of Norway, whose candidacy was supported by the United States and the European Union.

== Death ==
Nakajima died after a short illness in Poitiers, France, on January 26, 2013.

Positions in intergovernmental organisations
Preceded by Halfdan T. Mahler	Director-General of the World Health Organization; 1988–1998	Succeeded by Gro Harlem Brundtland
