= Natural resistance-associated macrophage protein 1 =

Protein-coding gene in the species Homo sapiens

SLC11A1

Identifiers
- Aliases: SLC11A1, LSH, NRAMP, NRAMP1, solute carrier family 11 member 1
- External IDs: OMIM: 600266; MGI: 1345275; GeneCards: SLC11A1

Gene location (Human)
Chr.	Chromosome 2 (human)
Band	2q35	Start	218,382,029 bp
Band	2q35	End	218,396,894 bp

Gene location (Mouse)
Chr.	Chromosome 1 (mouse)
Band	1 C3|1 38.54 cM	Start	74,414,354 bp
Band	1 C3|1 38.54 cM	End	74,425,221 bp
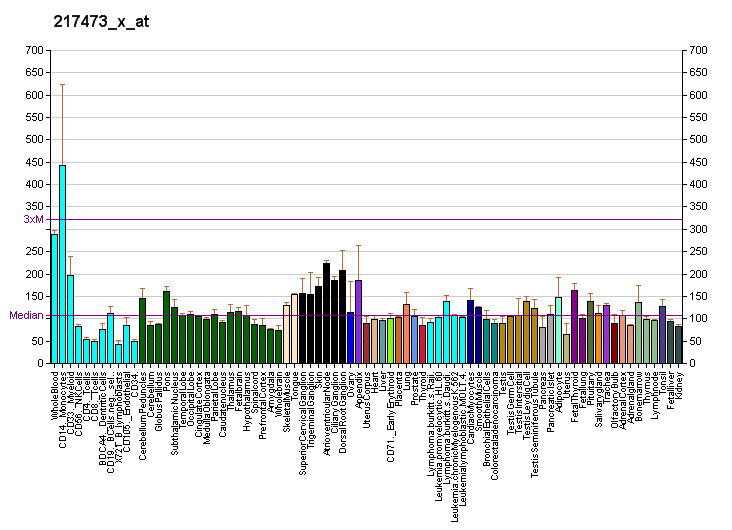

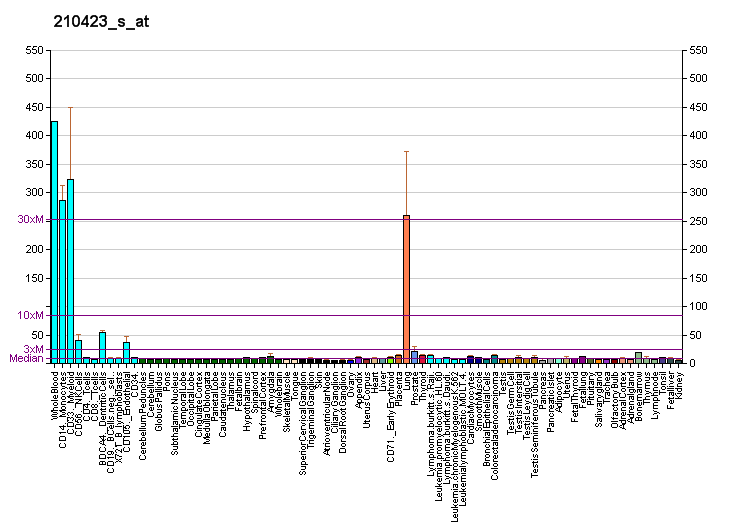

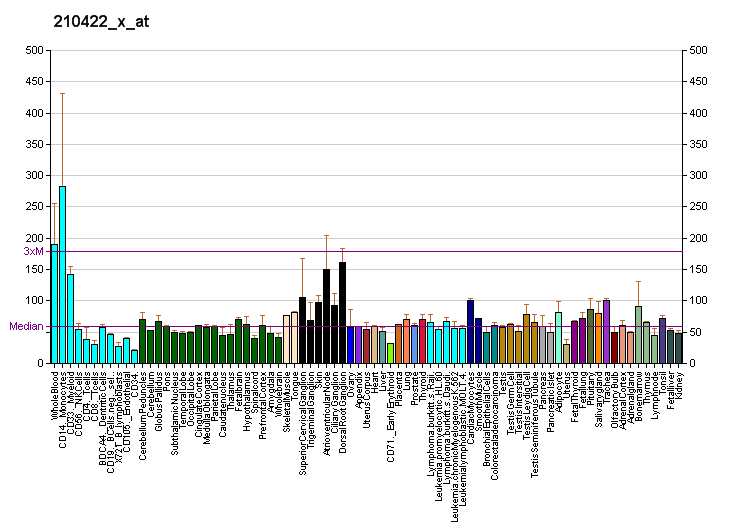
RNA expression pattern
Bgee	Human / Mouse (ortholog); Top expressed in: right lung; upper lobe of left lung; granulocyte; monocyte; blood; spleen; buccal mucosa cell; left uterine tube; left adrenal cortex; bone marrow cell / Top expressed in: granulocyte; stroma of bone marrow; spleen; internal carotid artery; mesenteric lymph nodes; tibiofemoral joint; morula; ciliary body; blood; carotid body; More reference expression data
BioGPS	More reference expression data
Gene ontology
Molecular function	manganese ion transmembrane transporter activity; protein homodimerization activity; transition metal ion transmembrane transporter activity; metal ion:proton antiporter activity; metal ion transmembrane transporter activity; cadmium ion transmembrane transporter activity; iron ion transmembrane transporter activity
Cellular component	integral component of membrane; late endosome; phagocytic vesicle membrane; membrane; late endosome membrane; integral component of plasma membrane; lysosome; endosome membrane; plasma membrane; tertiary granule membrane; ficolin-1-rich granule membrane
Biological process	manganese ion transmembrane transport; interleukin-3 production; positive regulation of phagocytosis; response to bacterium; response to interferon-gamma; positive regulation of cytokine production; iron ion homeostasis; positive regulation of interferon-gamma production; wound healing; ion transport; cellular cadmium ion homeostasis; cell redox homeostasis; T cell proliferation involved in immune response; vacuolar acidification; respiratory burst; multicellular organismal iron ion homeostasis; mRNA stabilization; response to lipopolysaccharide; antigen processing and presentation of peptide antigen; positive regulation of dendritic cell antigen processing and presentation; positive regulation of gene expression; iron ion transport; defense response to bacterium; positive regulation of T-helper 1 type immune response; MHC class II biosynthetic process; defense response to Gram-negative bacterium; cadmium ion transmembrane transport; phagocytosis; manganese ion transport; nitrite transport; macrophage activation; inflammatory response; T cell cytokine production; interleukin-2 production; negative regulation of cytokine production; activation of protein kinase activity; positive regulation of transcription by RNA polymerase II; cellular iron ion homeostasis; defense response to protozoan; antimicrobial humoral response; neutrophil degranulation; metal ion transport; iron ion transmembrane transport
Sources:Amigo / QuickGO
Orthologs
Databases	NCBI: entry; OMA: entry
Species	Human	Mouse
Entrez	6556	18173
Ensembl	ENSG00000018280	ENSMUSG00000026177
UniProt	P49279	P41251
RefSeq (mRNA)	NM_000578; NM_001032220	NM_013612
RefSeq (protein)	NP_000569	NP_038640
Location (UCSC)	Chr 2: 218.38 – 218.4 Mb	Chr 1: 74.41 – 74.43 Mb
PubMed search
- Wikidata
View/Edit Human	View/Edit Mouse

Natural resistance-associated macrophage protein 1 is a protein that in humans is encoded by the SLC11A1 gene.

== Function ==
This gene is a member of the solute carrier family 11 (proton-coupled divalent metal ion transporters) family and encodes a multi-pass membrane protein. The protein functions as a divalent transition metal (iron and manganese) transporter involved in iron metabolism and host resistance to certain pathogens. Mutations in this gene have been associated with susceptibility to infectious diseases such as tuberculosis and leprosy, and inflammatory diseases such as rheumatoid arthritis and Crohn's disease. Alternatively spliced variants that encode different protein isoforms have been described but the full-length nature of only one has been determined.

== See also ==
- Solute carrier family
