= Peter MacCallum =

Australian oncologist (1885–1974)

Sir Peter MacCallum MC, FRSE, FRCPE
- Born: 14 July 1885; Glasgow, Scotland
- Died: 4 March 1974 (aged 88); Kew, Melbourne, Victoria, Australia
- Education: University of Edinburgh
- Occupation: Oncologist
- Years active: 1924–1963
- Employer: University of Melbourne
- Known for: Co-founder, Victorian Cancer Institute (1949); Chairman, Anti-Cancer Council of Victoria (1946–1963); Chairman, Australian Red Cross (1951–1957)
- Spouses: Bella Dytes McIntosh Cross (m. 1919; died 1927); Ursula Lillie Grace (m. 1928; died 1941); Frieda Maud Davies (m. 1946; died 1953)
- Military career
- Allegiance: United Kingdom (WWI); Australia (WWII)
- Branch: Royal Army Medical Corps (WWI); Australian Army (WWII)
- Rank: Lieutenant colonel
- Commands: Australian Army Medical Corps (WWII)
- Battles: World War I; World War II
- Awards: Military Cross

Sir Peter MacCallum MC, FRSE, FRCPE (14 July 1885 – 4 March 1974) was a Scottish-born Australian oncologist and the co-founder and eponym of the Peter MacCallum Cancer Centre in Melbourne.

== Background and early life ==
Peter MacCallum was born in Glasgow, Scotland on 14 July 1885. He was the son of Peter MacCallum, a New Zealander, living at Gairfield House in the Maryhill district of Glasgow.

The family returned to New Zealand in his youth and he was raised in Christchurch, his father's home town. He was sent to work at the age of 12. He was able to return to school and continued his entire education through a series of scholarships and part-time work, including working his way back to the United Kingdom as a coal trimmer. He eventually obtained an MB ChB back in Scotland at the University of Edinburgh in 1914, just in time to join the British Army in France.

== Career ==
During the First World War, he was awarded the Military Cross and was twice mentioned in dispatches. In 1918, he was badly gassed, and perhaps it was a result of ill health that his postwar career concentrated on pathology and research.

In 1924, he was appointed to the Chair of Pathology at the University of Melbourne. Typically, he soon directed his energy and concern to one of the greatest medical challenges, the fight against cancer. In 1928, he was appointed to the royal commission into the Bundaberg tragedy, chaired by Charles Kellaway, which concluded that a diphtheria vaccine manufactured by Commonwealth Serum Laboratories had been contaminated with Staph. aureus.

In 1935, he was elected a Fellow of the Royal Society of Edinburgh. His proposers were Anderson Gray McKendrick, William Frederick Harvey, Thomas Jones Mackie and Alfred Joseph Clark. In the Second World War he served at the rank of Lieutenant colonel as the Director of Pathology to the Australian Army Medical Corps and from 1941 was the chief co-ordinator of Australian medical personnel.

As Chairman of the Anti-Cancer Council of Victoria from 1946 to 1963, he was influential in the formation of the Victorian Cancer Institute in 1949. The first outpatient clinic opened in 1950 bore his name and the Institute was renamed as the Peter MacCallum Cancer Institute - "The Peter Mac" - in his honour in 1986.

MacCallum was Chairman of the Australian Red Cross from 1951 to 1957 and was knighted by Elizabeth II in 1953. MacCallum's vision created a cancer centre where humanity, caring service and relentless research share equal value. He believed that nothing but the best was good enough in the treatment of cancer.

== Personal life ==
MacCallum was married and widowed three times. His first marriage in 1919 was to Bella Dytes McIntosh Cross (better known as Bella MacCallum) with whom he had three daughters. His second marriage in 1928 was to Ursula Lillie Grace (died 1941) and together they had a son. His third marriage was to Frieda Maud Davies (died 1953).

MacCallum died in Kew on 4 March 1974 at the age of 88.
