= Tedros Adhanom Ghebreyesus =

Ethiopian public health official (born 1965)

Tedros Adhanom Ghebreyesus HonFRS
- ቴዎድሮስ አድሓኖም ገብረኢየሱስ
- Tedros in 2025

8th Director-General of the World Health Organization
- Incumbent
- Assumed office 1 July 2017
- Deputy: Zsuzsanna Jakab; Michael Ryan
- Preceded by: Margaret Chan

Minister of Foreign Affairs
- In office 29 November 2012 – 1 November 2016
- Prime Minister: Hailemariam Desalegn
- Preceded by: Berhane Gebre-Christos (acting)
- Succeeded by: Workneh Gebeyehu

Minister of Health
- In office 12 October 2005 – 29 November 2012
- Prime Minister: Meles Zenawi; Hailemariam Desalegn
- Preceded by: Kebede Tadesse
- Succeeded by: Kesetebirhan Admasu

Personal details
- Born: 3 March 1965 (age 61) Asmara, Ethiopia
- Party: Tigray People's Liberation Front
- Children: 5
- Education: University of Asmara (BS); London School of Hygiene & Tropical Medicine (MSc); University of Nottingham (PhD)
- Scientific career
- Fields: Community health
- Thesis: The effects of dams on malaria transmission in Tigray Region, northern Ethiopia, and appropriate control measures (2000)

Tedros Adhanom Ghebreyesus (Ge'ez: ቴዎድሮስ አድሓኖም ገብረኢየሱስ, sometimes spelled ቴድሮስ ኣድሓኖም ገብረየሱስ; (Note: Tigrinya pronunciation: [teˈdɾos ɐdˈħänom gɐbɾɐˈjɐsus], Amharic pronunciation: [tewoˈdɾos ädɨˈhänom gəbɾəiˈjɛsus]) born 3 March 1965) is an Ethiopian public health official, researcher, diplomat, and the director-general of the World Health Organization (WHO) since 2017. He is the first African to become WHO Director-General, receiving an endorsement for the role by the African Union. Tedros played a role in the response to the Ebola virus epidemic, the COVID-19 pandemic, and the 2022–2023 mpox outbreak.

Prior to serving as Director-General, he held two high-level positions in the government of Ethiopia: Minister of Health from 2005 to 2012 and Minister of Foreign Affairs from 2012 to 2016. Tedros was included in Time's 100 Most Influential People of 2020.

== Early life and education ==
Tedros was born in Asmara to Adhanom Ghebreyesus and Melashu Weldegabir. His family originated from the Enderta awrajja of Tigray. The name "Ghebreyesus" is from his grandfather, and is not their family name. Tedros recalled that as a child he was very aware of the suffering and death caused by malaria. His younger brother died at the age of three or four years, possibly of a preventable disease like measles, which Tedros often discusses as a defining personal experience in regards to the need for global healthcare.

In 1986, Tedros received a Bachelor of Science degree in biology from the University of Asmara. He studied at the London School of Hygiene & Tropical Medicine and was awarded a Master of Science degree in immunology of infectious diseases from the University of London in 1992. In 2000, he earned a Doctor of Philosophy degree in community health from the University of Nottingham for research on the effects of dams on malaria transmission in the Tigray region.

== Early career ==
In 1986, after his first degree, Tedros joined the Ethiopian Ministry of Health as a junior public health expert.

Tedros joined the Tigray People's Liberation Front. In 2001, Tedros was appointed head of the Tigray Regional Health Bureau. In 2003, he was appointed a State Minister (deputy minister) for Health, a post he held for just over a year.

== Ethiopian politics ==
=== Minister of Health of Ethiopia (2005–2012) ===
In October 2005, Tedros was appointed Minister of Health of Ethiopia by Prime Minister Meles Zenawi of Tigray People's Liberation Front. At this time, the Ethiopian health ministry faced challenges that included poverty, poor infrastructure, and a declining global economic situation; Ethiopia employed fewer doctors than the number of Ethiopian doctors working in the Chicago metropolitan area. A review published in Global Health Governance considered progress in health indicators during this period to be significant. The Health Ministry's activities from 2005 to 2008 were supported by US$1.9 billion in development aid, increased focus on links between community and centralized health systems, and less exclusive attention to HIV/AIDS and malaria. Tedros designed the health workforce "flooding" reform strategy that has resulted in the training and deployment of thousands of doctors, nurses, pharmacists, laboratory technologists and health officers. This program included the construction of 4,000 health centres, trained and deployed more than 30,000 health extension workers, and developed a new cadre of hospital management professionals as part of a Health Extension Program (HEP). A 2011 Demographic Health Survey suggests these efforts reduced Ethiopian infant mortality from 123 deaths per 1,000 live births in 2006 to 88 in 2011.

As Minister of Health, Tedros formed relationships with figures and organizations including former American president Bill Clinton, his Clinton Foundation and the Bill & Melinda Gates Foundation. In 2010, the US State Department named Ethiopia one of the US Global Health Initiative Plus countries, providing the country with greater access to resources for public health projects.

==== Global health initiatives ====
During his time as Minister of Health of Ethiopia, Tedros was very active in global health initiatives. Ethiopia was the first country to sign a compact with the International Health Partnership. He was chair of the Roll Back Malaria Partnership (2007–2009), a member of the Programme Coordinating Board of UNAIDS from 2009 to 2010 and the Global Fund to fight AIDS, Tuberculosis and Malaria from 2009 to 2011 and co-chair of the Partnership for Maternal, Newborn & Child Health (2005–2009). He also served as a member of the Global Alliance for Vaccines and Immunization (GAVI) Board as well as the Institute of Health Metrics and Evaluation (IHME) and the Stop TB Partnership Coordinating Board. He was also a member of several academic and global health think tanks including the Aspen Institute and Harvard School of Public Health. He served as vice-president of the 60th World Health Assembly that was held on 14–23 May 2007. From 2008 until 2009, he was a member of the High Level Task Force on Innovative International Financing for Health Systems, co-chaired by Gordon Brown and Robert Zoellick.

==== The Global Fund to Fight AIDS, Tuberculosis and Malaria ====
In July 2009, Tedros was elected board chair of The Global Fund to Fight AIDS, Tuberculosis and Malaria for a two-year term. In a profile published in April 2010, The Lancet reported that Tedros was "a household name at the Global Fund Secretariat" before his election as board chair where his leadership was regularly cited at the Global Fund that resulted in Ethiopia being named as an exemplary high-performing country.

==== Maternal and child health ====
Tedros oversaw a program introducing 30,000 health extension workers, focused on reducing maternal mortality and child mortality.

The rate of child deaths fell by 30 percent between 2005 and 2011. Infant mortality decreased by 23 percent, from 77 to 59 deaths per 1,000 births, while under-five mortality decreased by 28 percent, from 123 to 88 per 1,000 births. The number of expectant mothers who delivered with the help of a skilled provider rose from 6 percent in 2005 to 10 percent in 2011, according to the 2011 Ethiopia Demographic and Health Survey.

==== Tuberculosis ====
During Tedros's tenure as Minister of Health, tuberculosis prevention and treatment services were included as one of the packages of Health Extension Workers.

==== Malaria ====
Deaths from malaria fell by more than 50% from 2005 to 2007. The rate of new malaria admittances fell 54% in the country over the same period, while the number of childhood malaria cases reported at clinics fell by 60%. The Health Ministry conducted the distribution of 20.5 million insecticide-treated bed nets to protect over 10 million families in malaria-prone areas between 2005 and 2008.

==== AIDS ====
Under Tedros, the Ministry of Health was able to turn around Ethiopia's record of the highest number of new HIV infections in Africa, bringing the number down dramatically. The prevalence was reduced from its double-digit record to 4.2 in cities and 0.6 in rural areas. According to the HIV/AIDS Prevention and Control Office (HAPCO), Ethiopia's rate of HIV infection declined by 90% between 2002 and 2012, while AIDS-related death dropped by 53%. The number of people starting HIV treatment increased more than 150-fold during 2005–2008.

The decline in the infection rate has been attributed to the concerted effort of the Ministry of Health in providing medicines and organizing various awareness-raising programs. The office has managed to integrate the people in HIV prevention and control activities. The wide range of media campaigns to inform the public about the disease has helped achieve behavioral change. Prevention measures like the use of condoms have shot up starkly with increased awareness on the disease and advertising urging safe sex practices and condom use. The government's collaboration with local and international governmental and non-governmental organizations has also positively influenced access to HIV/AIDS related service centers.

==== Family planning ====
Under Tedros's tenure, the unmet need for family planning in Ethiopia declined, and the contraceptive prevalence rate doubled in five years. Contraceptive prevalence rates reached 65% in 2015 by reaching an additional 6.2 million women and adolescent girls. Recognising that early childrearing is a major factor in infant mortality, the Ministry of Health targeted its efforts on adolescent girls (15 to 19 years) who have the highest unmet need for family planning.

=== Minister of Foreign Affairs of Ethiopia (2012–2016) ===
In November 2012, Tedros became Ethiopia's Minister of Foreign Affairs. He held this position until 2016, as part of Hailemariam Desalegn's cabinet reshuffle after he was approved by the EPRDF as party leader (and thus Prime Minister).

==== Financing for Development Conference (FfD3) ====
Tedros was instrumental in the successful outcome of the Third International Conference for Financing for Development, which was held in Addis Ababa, Ethiopia, on 13–16 July 2015. He was responsible for the organization of the Addis Ababa Action Agenda (AAAA) document in which the attending countries committed to financing for the Sustainable Development Goals.

The outcome document, the Addis Ababa Action Agenda (AAAA), set policy actions by Member States, which draw upon all sources of finance, technology, innovation, trade, and data to support the implementation of the Sustainable Development Goals. The Conference was criticized by a few observers for failing to come up with new money for implementing the SDGs while a follow-up April 2016 report by the Economic and Social Council Forum was much more optimistic and provided the framework to monitor the commitments. Tedros served as a member of the High Level Task Force for innovative financing for Health Systems chaired by former World Bank President and U.K. Prime Minister Gordon Brown.

==== Agenda 2063 of Africa Union ====
As Chair of the Executive Council of the AU in 2014, Tedros highlighted the need for a paradigm shift in Africa's political and socio-economic governance and development to realize the continent's long-term agendas. He emphasized the need for Africa to focus on issues of economic emancipation, peace and stability, the acceleration of rapid economic growth, governance and democratization. During his tenure, the AU adopted its First Ten Year Implementation Plan for Agenda 2063 – a roadmap for achieving a prosperous Africa based on inclusive growth and sustainable growth, which has placed health as its centerpiece.

==== West Africa Ebola Crises ====
As Minister of Foreign Affairs, Tedros played a pivotal leadership role in the Africa Union's response to the 2013–2016 Western African Ebola virus epidemic. He particularly facilitated greater country ownership and urging countries to adhere to the WHO guidelines including the full implementation of the International Health Regulations. He also advocated that the Ebola crises offer a unique opportunity to strengthen primary health care and highlight the importance of health as a critical security issue. In an interview he conducted with Devex in November 2014, Tedros discusses what "disappointed" him in the global response to Ebola, the importance of solidarity in overcoming the outbreak, and how the deadly virus has transformed to a crisis beyond health. He also promptly mobilised 200 Ethiopian health workers highly trained in management of public health emergencies and surveillance (by an initiative he created when he was the Minister of Health) to join the African Union response team.

==== Hidase Dam controversy ====
In May 2013, controversy intensified over the under-construction Hidase Dam in the Benishangul-Gumuz near Sudan as Ethiopia began diverting the Blue Nile for the dam's construction. At that time, the dam was more than 22 percent complete and expected to produce 6,000 megawatts, making it Africa's largest hydroelectric power plant. The dam was expected to have a reservoir of around 70 billion cubic meters, which was scheduled to start filling in 2014. Egypt, Ethiopia and Sudan established an International Panel of Experts to review and assess the study reports on the dam. The panel consisted of 10 members; 6 from the three countries and 4 international in the fields of water resources and hydrologic modelling, dam engineering, socioeconomic, and environmental. The panel held its fourth meeting in Addis Ababa in November 2012. It reviewed documents about the environmental impact of the dam and visited the dam site. The panel submitted its preliminary report to the respective governments at the end of May 2013. Although the full report has not been made public, and will not be until it is reviewed by the governments, Egypt and Ethiopia both released details. The Ethiopian government stated that, according to the report, the dam meets international standards and will be beneficial to Egypt, Sudan and Ethiopia. According to the Egyptian government, the report found that the dimensions and size of the dam should be changed.

On 3 June 2013, while discussing the International Panel of Experts report with President Mohammad Morsi, Egyptian political leaders suggested methods to destroy the dam, including support for anti-government rebels. The discussion was televised live without those present at meeting aware. Ethiopia requested that the Egyptian Ambassador explain the meeting. Morsi's top aide apologized for the "unintended embarrassment" and his cabinet released a statement promoting "good neighborliness, mutual respect and the pursuit of joint interests without either party harming the other." Morsi reportedly believes that is better to engage Ethiopia rather than attempt to force them. However, on 10 June 2013, he said that "all options are open" because "Egypt's water security cannot be violated at all," clarifying that he was "not calling for war," but that he would not allow Egypt's water supply to be endangered. Tedros said the dam will be used exclusively for power generation and is being constructed in a way that takes Egypt's water security concerns into account. On 18 June, Tedros and Egyptian Foreign Minister Mohamed Kamel Amr issued a joint statement reiterating "their commitment to strengthen their bilateral relations and coordinate their efforts to reach an understanding regarding all outstanding issues between both countries in a manner of trust and openness building on the positive developments of their relations." Both agreed to review the report of the International Panel of Experts and implement their recommendations, working to defuse the tensions and ease the crisis.

== Director-General of World Health Organization (2017–present) ==
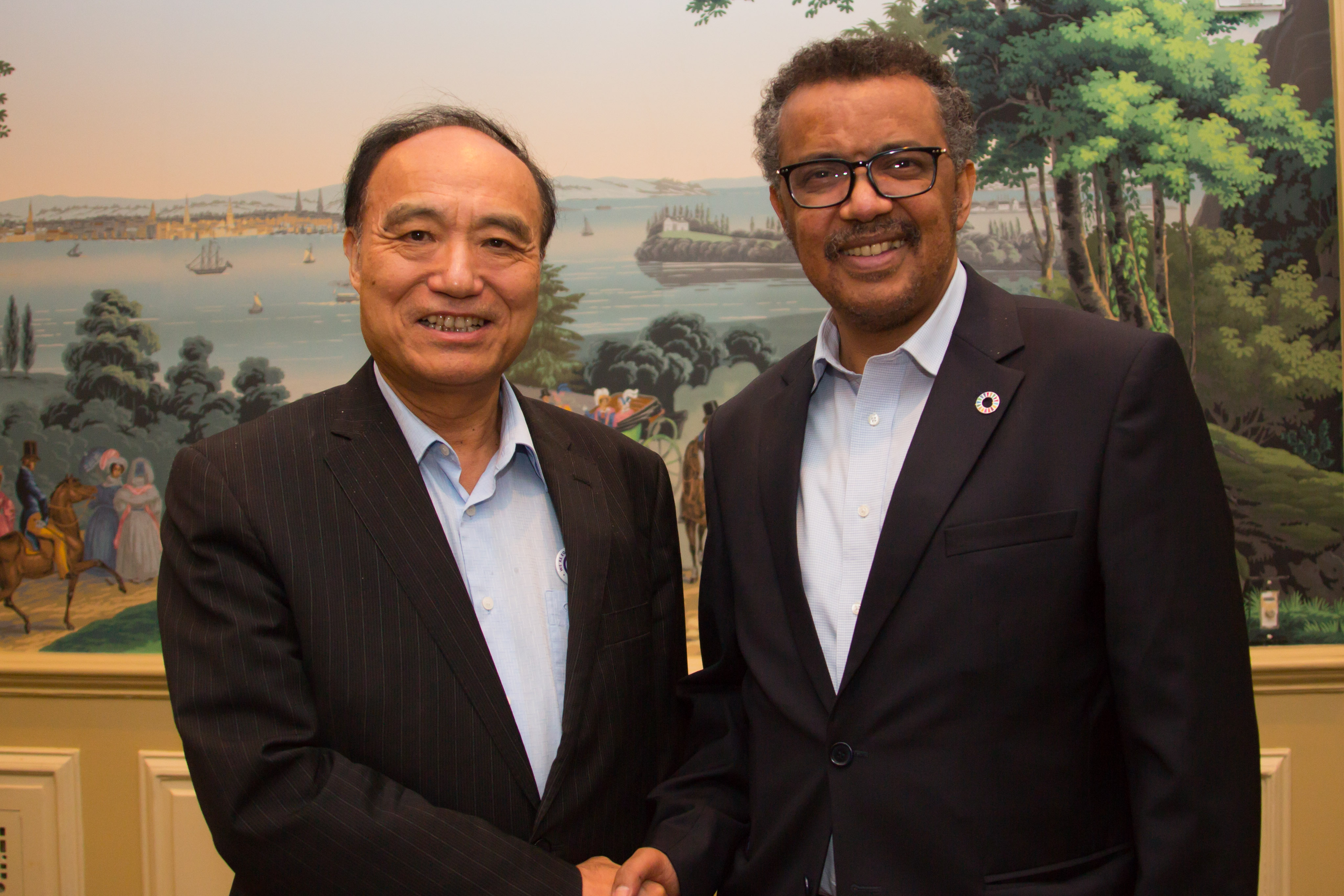
Tedros with Houlin Zhao in 2017

=== First term (2017–2022) ===
==== Electoral campaign ====
On 24 May 2016, on the margins of the 69th World Health Assembly, Tedros officially announced his candidacy for the post of the director-general of the World Health Organization as the sole African candidate, with endorsement from the African Union and Ministers of Health of the continent. His official launch of candidacy in Geneva was attended by the chairperson of the African Union Commission, Nkosazana Dlamini-Zuma, the Ministers of Foreign Affairs of Rwanda and Kenya, and the Minister of Health of Algeria. During the launch, it was stressed that the nomination of Tedros was based on merit and his prolific national and global credentials. His campaign tagline was "Together for a Healthier World." His Campaign Chair was Senait Fisseha, an Ethio-American lawyer and a professor of gynaecology and obstetrics from the University of Michigan. During this period she was also Director of International Programmes at the Susan Thompson Buffett Foundation, a post she held since 2015 to advance women's health and reproductive rights globally. She later led his transition team. Negash Kebret Botora, Ethiopia's ambassador to the UN and international organisations in Geneva, also played a critical role in the campaign. The campaign was supported in part by a fund created by East African countries. Tedros also hired Mercury Public Affairs, a US-based lobbying company, to help him with his bid.

During its 140th meeting in January 2017, the executive board of the WHO shortlisted Tedros as the front runner out of six candidates through two rounds of secret voting. He collected the most votes during both rounds. Tedros "was supported by a bloc of African and Asian countries, including China, which has considerable influence with those members" while "the US, UK and Canada... lent their support to... the British doctor David Nabarro." One observer called it "a really nasty" election.

Tedros was elected as Director-General of the World Health Organization by the World Health Assembly on 23 May 2017, becoming the first director-general who is not a medical doctor, with an overwhelming 133 votes out of 185. He became the first African to lead the WHO, as well as the first Director-General elected in a vote open to all Member States. He took office for a five-year term on 1 July 2017.

In May 2017, just prior to the WHO election, stories surfaced about an alleged cover-up of three possible cholera epidemics in Ethiopia in 2006, 2009 and 2011. The outbreaks were allegedly wrongly labelled as "acute watery diarrhea" (AWD)—a symptom of cholera—in the absence of laboratory confirmation of Vibrio cholerae in an attempt to play down the significance of the epidemics. UN officials said more aid and vaccines could have been delivered to Ethiopia if the outbreaks had been confirmed as cholera. The allegations were made by Larry Gostin, an American law professor who was acting as an adviser to rival candidate David Nabarro from the UK, and were reported in The New York Times. The African Union delegation to the UN dismissed the report as "an unfounded and unverified defamation campaign, conveniently coming out only days before the election." Tedros denied the allegation of a cover-up and said he was "not surprised at all but quite disappointed" by what he called a "last-minute smear campaign." When Tedros was named the new Director-General of the WHO, members of Ethiopia's Amhara community impacted by the alleged cover-up protested in front of WHO's headquarters in Geneva.

Tedros's candidacy for WHO director general was opposed vigorously by several Ethiopian parties, due to his past membership of the Tigray People's Liberation Front.

==== In office ====
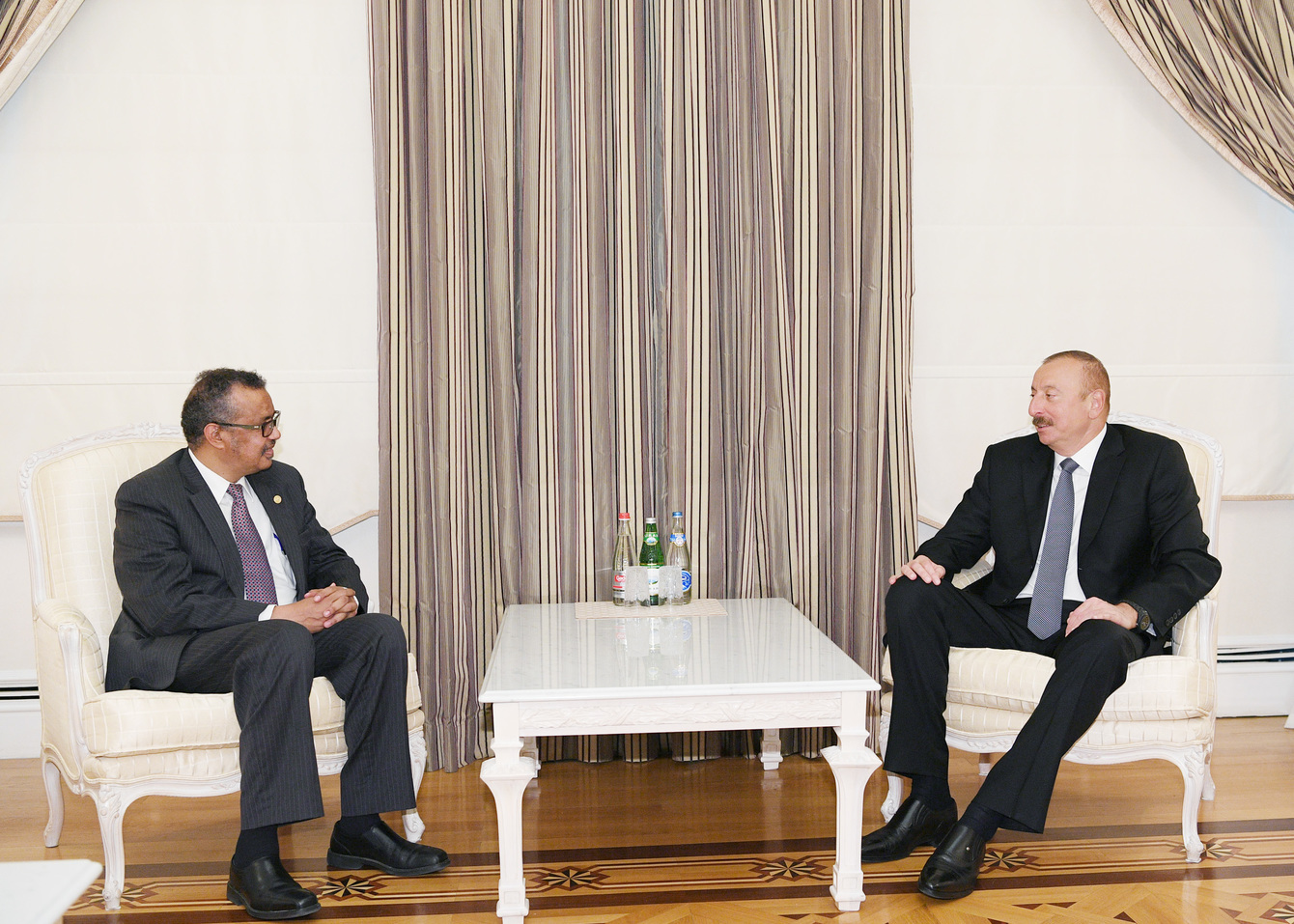
Tedros with Azerbaijan's President Ilham Aliyev in July 2018

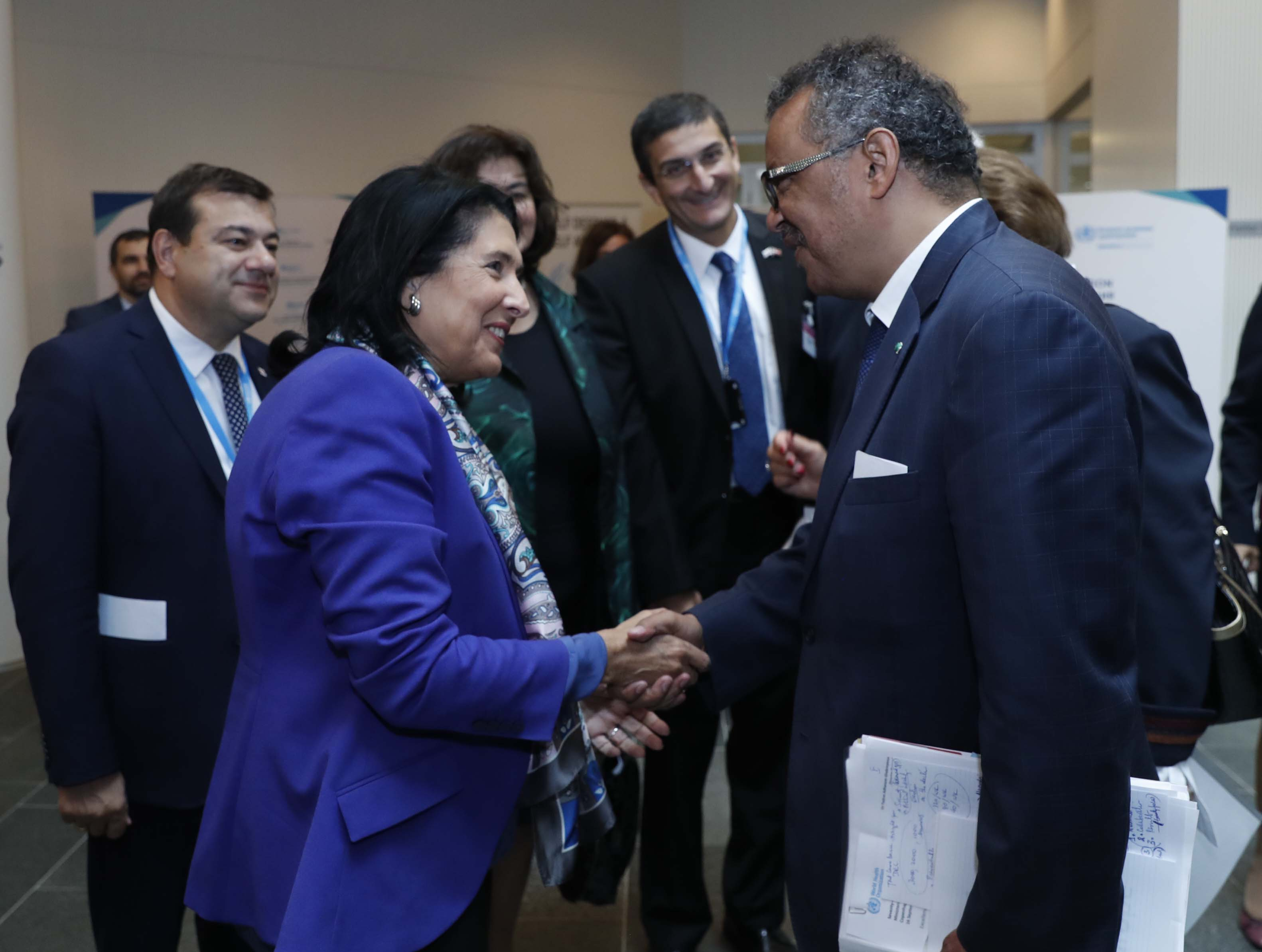
Tedros with Georgian President Salome Zourabichvili in September 2019

Tedros has overseen the WHO's management of the Kivu Ebola epidemic. He made early trips to both the Democratic Republic of Congo and China during the Kivu Ebola epidemic.

Tedros has identified universal health coverage as his top priority at the WHO. He campaigned on the issue and reiterated this focus in his first speech as Director-General and throughout the 72nd Session of the UN General Assembly. In October 2017, he announced his senior leadership team, with women representing 60% of appointments. While Tedros received praise for his commitment to gender equality, he also received criticism for a lack of transparency. He appointed Tereza Kasaeva of the Russian Ministry of Health to lead the WHO Global Tuberculosis Program without soliciting civil society input; days before the appointment, civil society organizations had published an open letter calling for a competitive, open process to identify the Program's new director.

On 18 October 2017, Tedros announced that he had chosen President Robert Mugabe of Zimbabwe to serve as a WHO Goodwill Ambassador to help tackle non-communicable diseases for Africa. He said Zimbabwe was "a country that places universal health coverage and health promotion at the centre of its policies to provide health care to all." Mugabe's appointment was severely criticised, with WHO member states and international organisations saying that Zimbabwe's healthcare system had in fact gone backwards under his regime, as well as pointing out Mugabe's many human rights abuses. It was also noted that Mugabe himself does not use his own country's health system, instead travelling to Singapore for treatment. Observers said Tedros was returning a campaign favour. Mugabe was chair of the African Union when Tedros was endorsed as a sole African Union candidate in a murky process that did not consider qualified alternatives like Michel Sidibé of Mali and Awa Marie Coll-Seck of Senegal. His judgement was widely questioned on social media. The editor-in-chief of Lancet, a prominent medical journal, called Tedros "Dictator-General." After a widespread condemnation, on 22 October 2017 Tedros rescinded Mugabe's goodwill ambassador role.

Tedros has aired concerns about the Tigray conflict in Ethiopia. In remarks to Turkey's Anadolu Agency, some Ethiopian government officials anonymously accused Tedros of soliciting support for the Tigray People's Liberation Front (TPLF) during the 2020 Tigray conflict. They accused him of pressurizing UN bodies so they would try to restrain the Government of Ethiopia's offensive on the TPLF, as well as seeking support from Egypt and East African nations for the group. Ethiopia's Chief of General Staff, Birhanu Jula Gelalcha, publicly accused Tedros of backing the group and trying to get weapons for them on 19 November 2020. Tedros denied soliciting support for the TPLF. On 14 January 2022 the Ethiopian government demanded the WHO investigate Tedros for supporting the TPLF.

==== COVID-19 pandemic response ====
In early 2020, Tedros oversaw the World Health Organization's management of the COVID-19 pandemic. In January 2020, Tedros met with Chinese leaders including Foreign Minister Wang Yi and Communist Party General Secretary Xi Jinping about COVID-19. On 23 January 2020, the WHO stated it did not yet rise to the level of an international emergency, but that the organization was closely tracking the virus' evolution. During the announcement, Tedros said "Make no mistake, though, this is an emergency in China. But it has not yet become a global health emergency. It may yet become one." On 31 January 2020, the WHO declared the COVID-19 outbreak a Public Health Emergency of International Concern (PHEIC). During the PHEIC announcement, Tedros stated there was no cause to limit trade or travel with China and said "Let me be clear, this declaration is not a vote of no confidence in China." In the first week of February 2020, Tedros reiterated per WHO and international guidelines that governments adopt policies to stop the spread of the disease that were "evidence-based and consistent," and not to "unnecessarily interfere with international travel and trade."

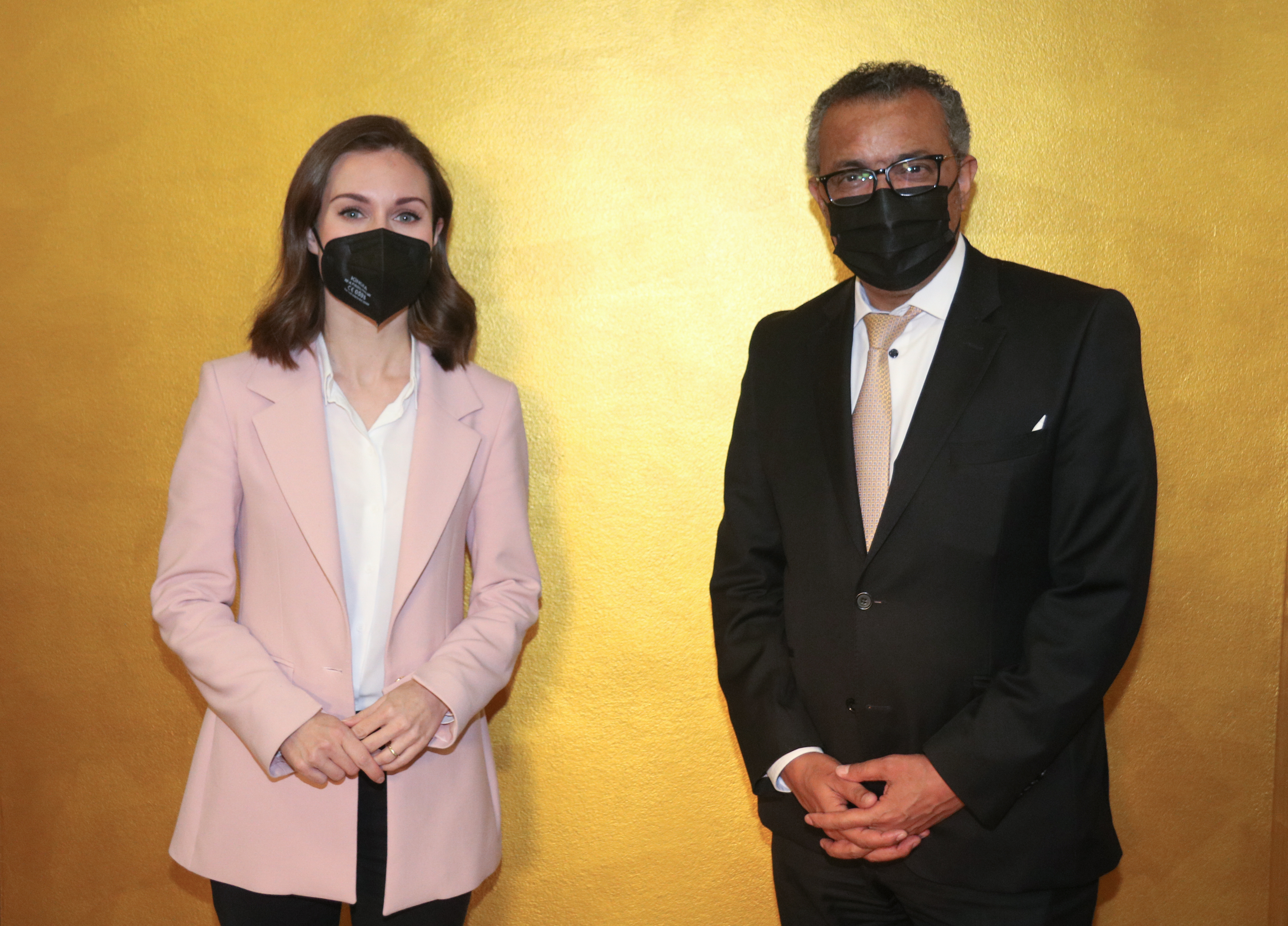
Tedros with Finnish Prime Minister Sanna Marin in October 2021 during the COVID-19 pandemic

On 11 March 2020, the WHO declared COVID-19 a pandemic. Tedros commented, "We are deeply concerned both by the alarming levels of spread and severity and by the alarming levels of inaction. We have therefore made the assessment that COVID-19 can be characterized as a pandemic." In March, he called the pandemic "the defining global health crisis of our time" and urged countries to increase testing for the virus, as well as warning of the damage the virus could do in poor countries. Tedros praised China for its containment measures, describing them as a "new standard for outbreak control."

During the COVID-19 pandemic some government officials and public-health experts accused Tedros of failing to declare a pandemic soon enough, and of having a too close relationship with the government of China. According to the BBC, "while Dr Tedros may be political, a lot of that political effort seems to be spent reassuring authoritarian, opaque governments, in a bid to get them to work with the WHO to tackle diseases which threaten global health." African leaders expressed support for Tedros's handling of the COVID-19 crisis, with South African President and Chair of the African Union Cyril Ramaphosa stating that he showed "exceptional leadership."

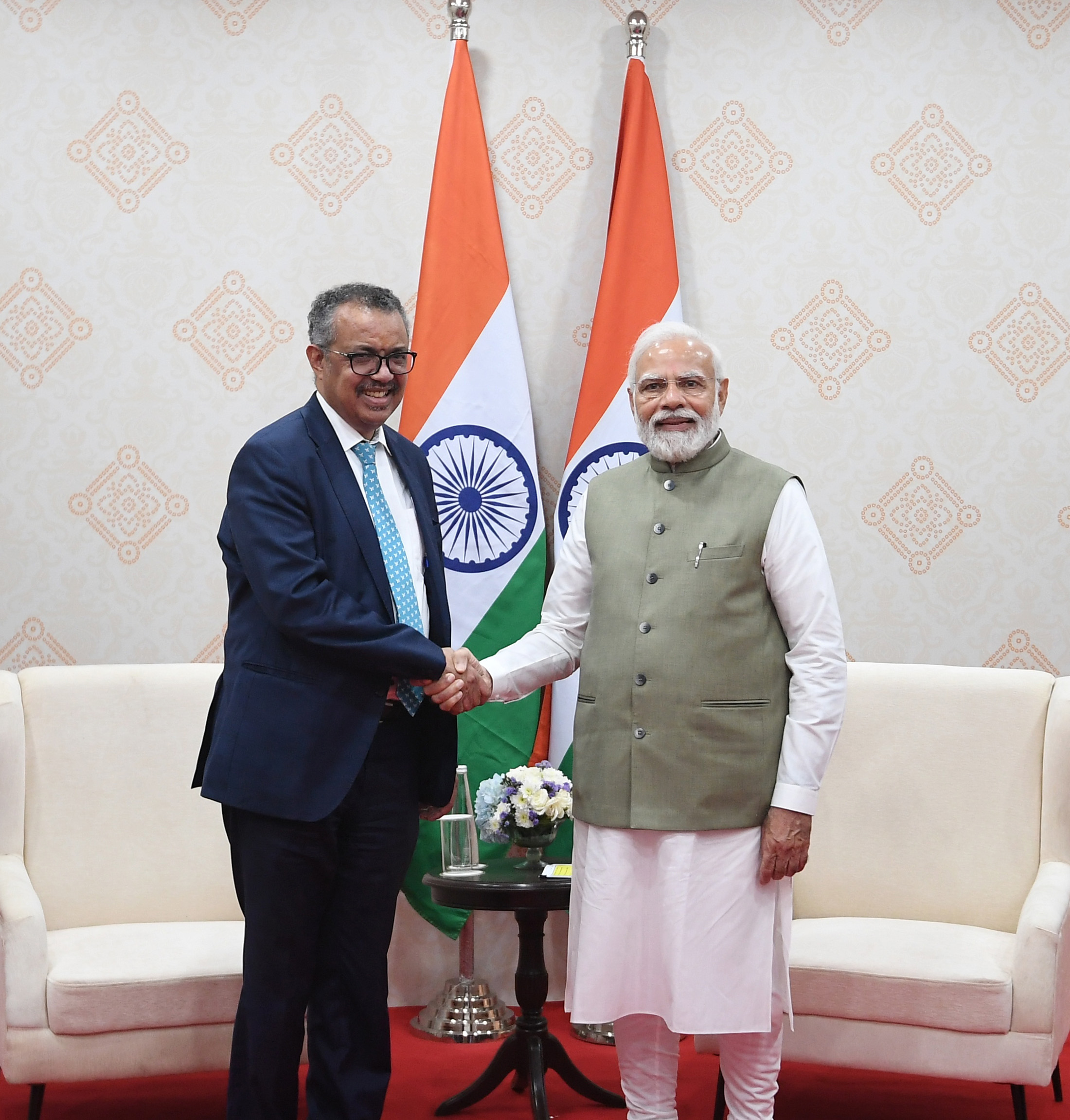
Tedros with Indian Prime Minister Narendra Modi in April 2022

On 8 April 2020, in response to President Donald Trump's threat to cut U.S. funding to the WHO, Tedros asked that the virus not be politicized and called for unity in fighting the "common enemy."

On 19 December 2020, during the height of the pandemic, the WHO, under Tedros's leadership, announced that it had secured 2 billion vaccine doses for distribution starting in 2021, once they had been approved by national agencies. Earlier that month, he said, "progress on vaccines gives us all a lift and we can now start to see the light at the end of the tunnel. However, WHO is concerned that there is a growing perception that the COVID-19 pandemic is over".

In May 2022, Tedros commented that the zero-COVID strategy is no longer considered sustainable based on "the behavior of the virus now" and future trends. The comment was suppressed on the Chinese Internet.

==== Taiwan and the WHO ====
Amid Taiwan's successful early response to the pandemic in 2020, its bid to be included in the WHO gained international attention with strong support from the United States, Japan, Germany and Australia.

In an April 2020 interview, WHO Assistant Director-General Bruce Aylward appeared to dodge a question from RTHK reporter Yvonne Tong about Taiwan's response to the pandemic and inclusion in the WHO, asking to move to another question. When the video chat was restarted, he was asked another question about Taiwan. He responded by indicating that they had already discussed China and formally ended the interview.

With Taiwan's bid to join the WHO and Aylward's interview controversy as backdrop, Tedros said he had received death threats and racist remarks that he attributed to Taiwan with complicity from its Foreign Ministry, an allegation Taiwanese officials vehemently denied, requesting an apology. Taiwanese Foreign Minister Joseph Wu said the claim had no evidence. Taiwan's Justice Ministry investigators reportedly uncovered an effort by Chinese netizens to exploit the controversy by "falsely identifying themselves as Taiwanese and issuing apologies to Tedros online."

==== Ukraine and white bias ====
Regarding the humanitarian crisis in Ukraine, following the 2022 Russian invasion of Ukraine, Tedros said that the attention given to the conflict was significantly larger than other crises in Ethiopia, Yemen, Syria or Afghanistan and said it seemed like this was a result of bias against non-white lives.

In February 2023, he rejected criticism from the Russian government that the WHO was using the word "invasion" to describe Russia's invasion of Ukraine, saying that "I used the same word in a speech last year. I couldn't find any other word that would represent it because it's the truth."

==== Blockade of the Tigray region ====
In early October 2021, Mark Lowcock, who led OCHA during part of the Tigray War between the Ethiopian government and Tigray rebels, stated that the Ethiopian federal government was deliberately starving Tigray. Tedros called the blockade by Ethiopia "an insult to our humanity", saying "Imagine a complete blockade of seven million people for more than a year. And there is no food. There is no medication, no medicine. No electricity. No telecom. No media."

==== Mpox declaration ====
On 23 July 2022, Tedros declared the 2022 mpox outbreak a Public Health Emergency of International Concern (PHEIC), despite 9 of the experts in the committee disagreeing with the call and only 6 in favour.

=== Second term (2022–present) ===
==== Reelection bid ====
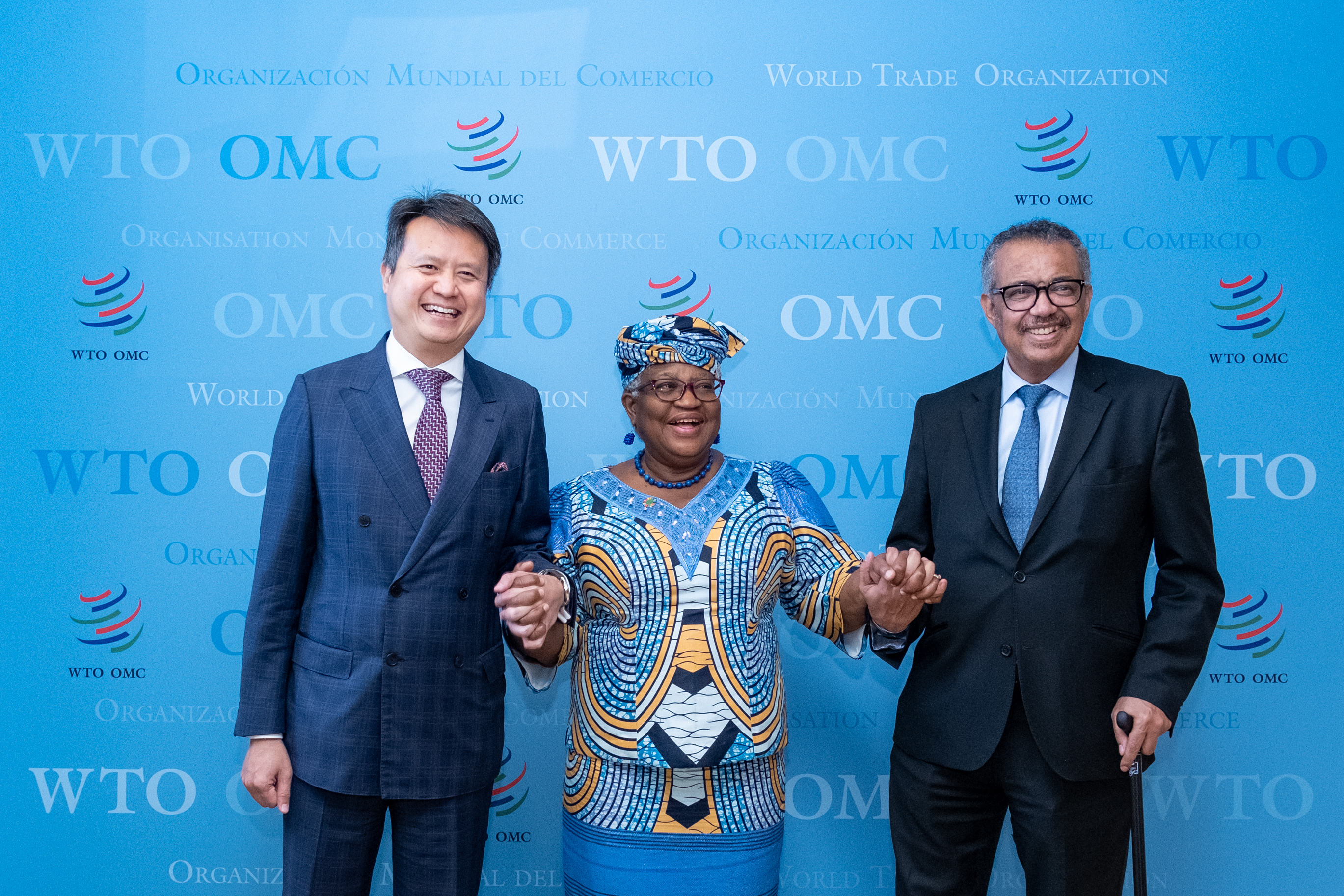
Tedros with WIPO's Daren Tang and WTO's Ngozi Okonjo-Iweala in 2023

Tedros made plans to seek re-appointment as early as May 2021. On 22 September 2021 Germany proposed him for a further term without opposition. In fact by 29 October he had been nominated by 28 nations: Austria, Bahrain, Barbados, Botswana, Cook Islands, Croatia, Denmark, Estonia, Finland, France, Germany, Greece, Hungary, Indonesia, Ireland, Kazakhstan, Kenya, Luxembourg, Malta, Netherlands, Oman, Portugal, Rwanda, Slovakia, Spain, Sweden, Tonga, and Trinidad and Tobago. He was poised for a second term since no opposing candidate has surfaced. He was re-appointed on 24 May 2022, unopposed for a term that was scheduled to begin on 16 August 2022.

==== Termination of regional director Takeshi Kasai ====
Under Tedros "zero tolerance" policy against misconduct, doctor Takeshi Kasai was dismissed in 2023 from his role as the Western Pacific regional director, the first time in WHO's history for someone at such a high position. An internal investigation had found Kasai to have engaged in public humiliation of staff members and making comments such as the "inferior culture" and "race" of Pacific countries that did not have the capacity to manage COVID-19 cases on their own. Several workers also said Kasai improperly shared sensitive vaccine information to help Japan, his home country. Observers remarked that Tedros needs to enforce the policy more consistently, even in low profile cases such as reports of sexual abuse and exploitation during the 2018–2020 Kivu Ebola epidemic.

==== In office ====
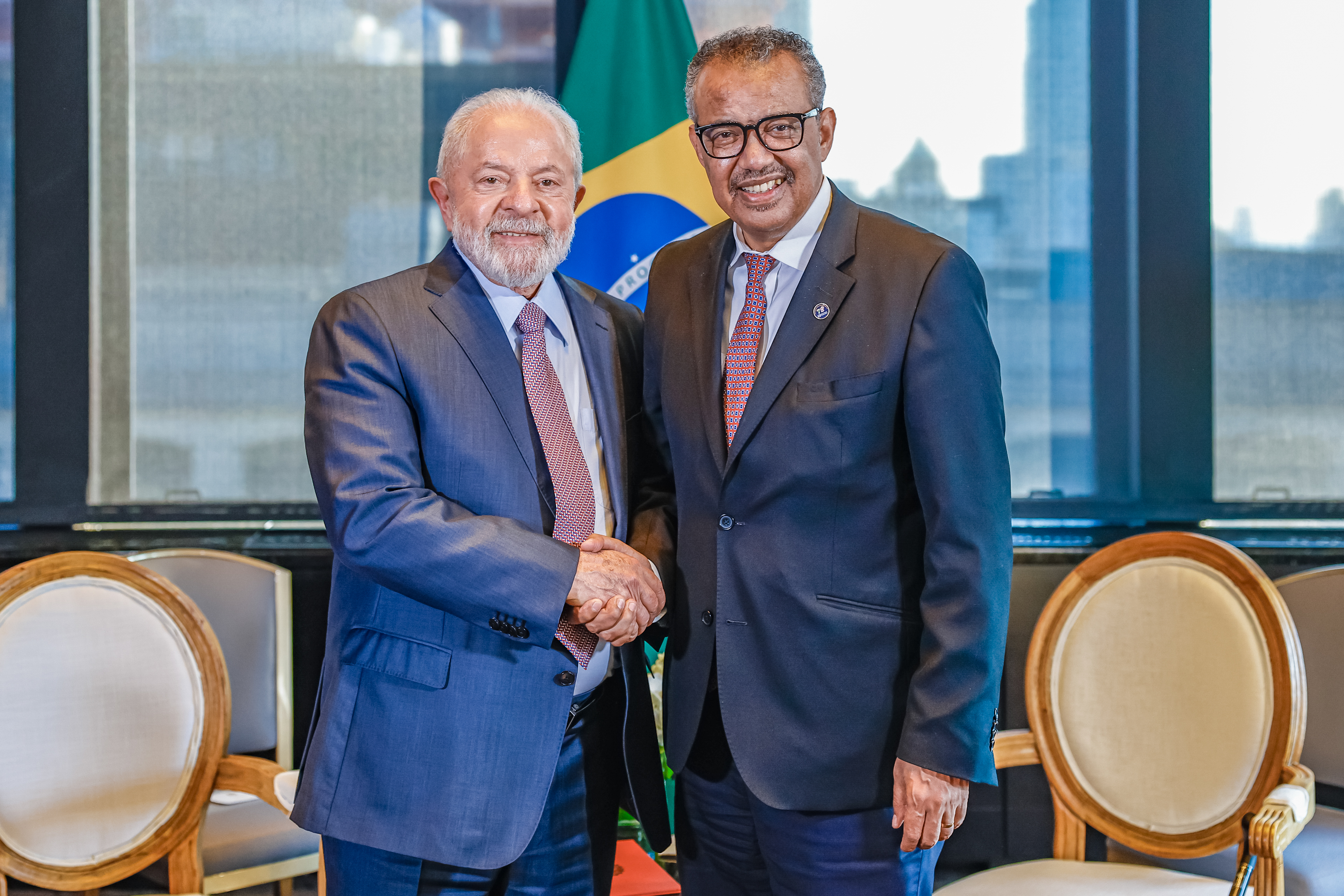
Tedros with Brazilian President Luiz Inácio Lula da Silva in September 2023

In February 2023, following the Turkey–Syria earthquakes, Ghebreyesus visited Antakya, Turkey, and Aleppo, Syria, to ensure more aid to the affected areas.

In 2023, he warned of the humanitarian impact of the war in Sudan, saying that 40% of the Sudanese population was suffering from hunger.

In December 2023, speaking about the situation in Afghanistan, Ghebreyesus said that 30% of the Afghan population was facing acute food insecurity, adding that "Close to 1 million children are severely malnourished and 2.3 million are suffering from moderate acute malnutrition. WHO needs $ 185 million to continue providing medicine and supporting hospitals to prevent more Afghan children and women from dying of malnutrition and the consequences of food insecurity."

In October 2025, Tedros condemned the El Fasher massacre in Sudan, including the reported killings of over 460 patients and companions at the Saudi Maternity Hospital in El Fasher.

==== Gaza war ====
Tedros condemned the attack by Hamas on Israel on 7 October 2023 and called for the release of all hostages.

On 29 October 2023, Tedros described as "deeply concerning" reports from the Palestinian Red Crescent that the al-Quds hospital had received an urgent evacuation warning and notice that it was "going to be bombarded" as "deeply concerning." He reiterated that it was "impossible to evacuate hospitals full of patients without endangering their lives". He said on X that he was "utterly shocked by reports of attacks on ambulances evacuating patients", adding that patients, health workers and medical facilities must always be protected.

In December 2023, he criticized Israel's blockade of the Gaza Strip, saying that "Resupplying health facilities has become extremely difficult and is deeply compromised by the security situation on the ground and inadequate resupply from outside Gaza."

In January 2024, Tedros described conditions in Gaza as "hellish". He called for a ceasefire and a "true solution" to the Israel-Palestinian conflict.

On 26 December 2024, Tedros was caught up in an Israeli airstrike on Sanaa International Airport in Yemen while he was visiting the country on official business. He later developed tinnitus from the explosions.

== Personal life ==
Tedros is married and has five children. He is an Ethiopian Orthodox Christian.

== Membership ==
- 2005–2009: Partnership for Maternal, Newborn & Child Health, co-chair
- 2005–2006: Stop TB Partnership, Coordinating board member
- 2007: 60th World Health Assembly, Vice President
- 2007: 56th Session of WHO Regional Committee for Africa, Chairman
- 2007–2009: Roll Back Malaria (RBM) Partnership, Chair
- 2008–2009: GAVI, the Vaccine Alliance, board member
- 2009–2011: Global Fund, Chair
- 2009: The Aspen Institute, Ministerial Leadership Initiative, Aspen Global Health and Development at the Aspen Institute, Ministry Team
- 2011–2017: The Aspen Institute, Global Leaders Council for Reproductive Health, Member
- 2012–2014: Harvard University, Ministerial Leadership in Health Program, Advisory Board
- 2012–2017: High-Level Task Force for the International Conference on Population and Development (ICPD), Member
- 2015–?: Tana High Level Forum on Security in Africa, board member
- Every Woman Every Child, Steering Group Member

== Awards ==
- 1999: American Society of Tropical Medicine and Hygiene, Young Investigator of the Year
- 2003: Ethiopian Public Health Association, Young Public Health Researcher Award
- 2011: National Foundation for Infectious Diseases, Jimmy and Rosalynn Carter Humanitarian Award
- 2012: London School of Hygiene & Tropical Medicine, Honorary Fellow
- 2012: Wired magazine, One of 50 people who will change the world in 2012
- 2012: Yale University, Stanley T. Woodward Lectureship
- 2015: New African magazine, One of the 100 most influential Africans for 2015
- 2016: Women Deliver Conference, Women Deliver Award for Perseverance
- 2018: Umeå University, Faculty of Medicine, Honorary Doctorate
- 2019: Newcastle University, honorary degree
- 2020: African leadership magazine, African of the Year 2020 Award.
- 2021: University of Nottingham, honorary professorship
- 2021: Nizami Ganjavi International Medal
- 2022: Ubuntu Humanitarian Award, 6th Ubuntu Awards, Special Ubuntu Humanitarian Award
- 2023: University of Michigan, Thomas Francis Jr. Medal in Global Public Health
- 2024: The University of Glasgow, honorary degree.
- 2024: University of Groningen, Honorary doctorate degree
- 2024: University of Nicosia, Honorary Doctoral Degree
- 2025: Oslo Metropolitan University (OsloMet), Honorary Doctoral Degree

== Selected works and publications ==
=== Journals ===
- Adhanom Ghebreyesus, Tedros; Alemayehu, Tesfamariam; Bosma, Andrea; Hanna Witten, Karen; Teklehaimanot, Awash (April 1996). "Community participation in malaria control in Tigray region Ethiopia". Acta Tropica. 61 (2): 145–156. doi:10.1016/0001-706X(95)00107-P. PMID 8740892. Wikidata ()
- Ghebreyesus, T. A; Haile, M.; Witten, K. H; Getachew, A.; Yohannes, A. M; Yohannes, M.; Teklehaimanot, H. D; Lindsay, S. W; Byass, P. (11 September 1999). "Incidence of malaria among children living near dams in northern Ethiopia: community based incidence survey". BMJ. 319 (7211): 663–666. doi:10.1136/bmj.319.7211.663. PMC 28216. PMID 10480820. Wikidata ()
- Ghebreyesus, Tedros Adhanom (2000). The effects of dams on malaria transmission in Tigray Region, northern Ethiopia, and appropriate control measures. Jisc Library Hub Discover (PhD thesis). University of Nottingham. OCLC 557465936. EThOS uk.bl.ethos.312201.
- Byass, Peter; Ghebreyesus, Tedros A (March 2005). "Making the world's children count". The Lancet. 365 (9465): 1114–1116. doi:10.1016/S0140-6736(05)71854-7. PMID 15794952. S2CID 31729737. Wikidata ()
- Chambers, Raymond G; Gupta, Rajat K; Ghebreyesus, Tedros Adhanom (April 2008). "Responding to the challenge to end malaria deaths in Africa". The Lancet. 371 (9622): 1399–1401. doi:10.1016/S0140-6736(08)60609-1. PMID 18440416. S2CID 43645141. Wikidata ()
- Coll-Seck, Awa Marie; Ghebreyesus, Tedros Adhanom; Court, Alan (16 April 2008). "Malaria: efforts starting to show widespread results". Nature. 452 (7189): 810. Bibcode:2008Natur.452..810C. doi:10.1038/452810b. PMID 18421325.
- Ghebreyesus, Tedros Adhanom; Kazatchkine, Michel; Sidibé, Michel; Nakatani, Hiroki (May 2010). "Tuberculosis and HIV: time for an intensified response". The Lancet. 375 (9728): 1757–1758. doi:10.1016/S0140-6736(10)60595-8. PMID 20488527. S2CID 205958519.
- Ghebreyesus, Tedros Adhanom (October 2010). "Achieving the health MDGs: country ownership in four steps". The Lancet. 376 (9747): 1127–1128. doi:10.1016/S0140-6736(10)61465-1. PMID 20864154. S2CID 26231795. Wikidata ()
- Feachem, Richard GA; Phillips, Allison A; Hwang, Jimee; Cotter, Chris; Wielgosz, Benjamin; Greenwood, Brian M; Sabot, Oliver; Rodriguez, Mario Henry; Abeyasinghe, Rabindra R; Ghebreyesus, Tedros Adhanom; Snow, Robert W (November 2010). "Shrinking the malaria map: progress and prospects". The Lancet. 376 (9752): 1566–1578. doi:10.1016/S0140-6736(10)61270-6. PMC 3044848. PMID 21035842. Wikidata ()
- Shargie, Estifanos Biru; Ngondi, Jeremiah; Graves, Patricia M.; Getachew, Asefaw; Hwang, Jimee; Gebre, Teshome; Mosher, Aryc W.; Ceccato, Pietro; Endeshaw, Tekola; Jima, Daddi; Tadesse, Zerihun; Tenaw, Eskindir; Reithinger, Richard; Emerson, Paul M.; Richards, Frank O.; Ghebreyesus, Tedros Adhanom (2010). "Rapid Increase in Ownership and Use of Long-Lasting Insecticidal Nets and Decrease in Prevalence of Malaria in Three Regional States of Ethiopia (2006–2007)". Journal of Tropical Medicine. 2010: 1–12. doi:10.1155/2010/750978. PMC 2948905. PMID 20936103. Wikidata ()
- De Cock, Kevin M; El-Sadr, Wafaa M; Ghebreyesus, Tedros A (August 2011). "Game Changers: Why Did the Scale-Up of HIV Treatment Work Despite Weak Health Systems?". Journal of Acquired Immune Deficiency Syndromes. 57: S61–S63. doi:10.1097/QAI.0B013E3182217F00. PMID 21857297. S2CID 41004155. Wikidata ()
- Fassil, Hareya; Ghebreyesus, Tedros Adhanom (November 2011). Low-Beer, Daniel (ed.). "Managing Health Partnerships at Country Level". Innovative Health Partnerships: The Diplomacy of Diversity. Global Health Diplomacy. 1: 89–115. doi:10.1142/9789814366168_0004. ISBN 978-981-4366-14-4.
- Levine, Adam C.; Presser, David Z.; Rosborough, Stephanie; Ghebreyesus, Tedros A.; Davis, Mark A. (28 June 2012). "Understanding Barriers to Emergency Care in Low-Income Countries: View from the Front Line". Prehospital and Disaster Medicine. 22 (5): 467–470. doi:10.1017/s1049023x00005240. PMID 18087920. S2CID 33981077.
- Gilmore, Kate; Gebreyesus, Tedros Adhanom (July 2012). "What will it take to eliminate preventable maternal deaths?". The Lancet. 380 (9837): 87–88. doi:10.1016/S0140-6736(12)60982-9. PMID 22784544. S2CID 205966571.
- Scheffler, Richard M.; Soucat, Agnes L. B. (2013). Ghebreyesus, Tedros Adhanom (ed.). The labor market for health workers in Africa: a new look at the crisis. Washington, D.C.: World Bank. ISBN 978-0-8213-9555-4.
- Admasu, Kesetebirhan; Balcha, Taye; Ghebreyesus, Tedros Adhanom (June 2016). "Pro–poor pathway towards universal health coverage: lessons from Ethiopia". Journal of Global Health. 6 (1) 010305. doi:10.7189/jogh.06.010305. PMC 4920007. PMID 27350871. Wikidata ()

=== Newspapers ===
- Gaga, Lady; Ghebreyesus, Tedros Adhanom (9 October 2018). "800,000 people kill themselves every year. What can we do?". The Guardian.
- Ghebreyesus, Tedros Adhanom (14 November 2019). "Why is the world losing the fight against history's most lethal disease?". The Guardian.
- Ghebreyesus, Tedros Adhanom (10 December 2019). "Ebola responders face deadly attacks. We must step up security in DRC". The Guardian.
- Abe, Shinzo; Ghebreyesus, Tedros Adhanom (12 December 2019). "Opinion: All nations should have universal health care". The Washington Post.

== Notes ==
Political offices
| Preceded by Kebede Tadesse | Minister of Health; 2005–2012 | Succeeded by Kesetebirhan Admasu |
| Preceded by Berhane Gebre-Christos; Acting | Minister of Foreign Affairs; 2012–2016 | Succeeded by Workneh Gebeyehu |
Positions in intergovernmental organisations
| Preceded by Margaret Chan | Director-General of the World Health Organization; 2017–present | Incumbent |
