= Alicia Ely Yamin =

American legal scholar

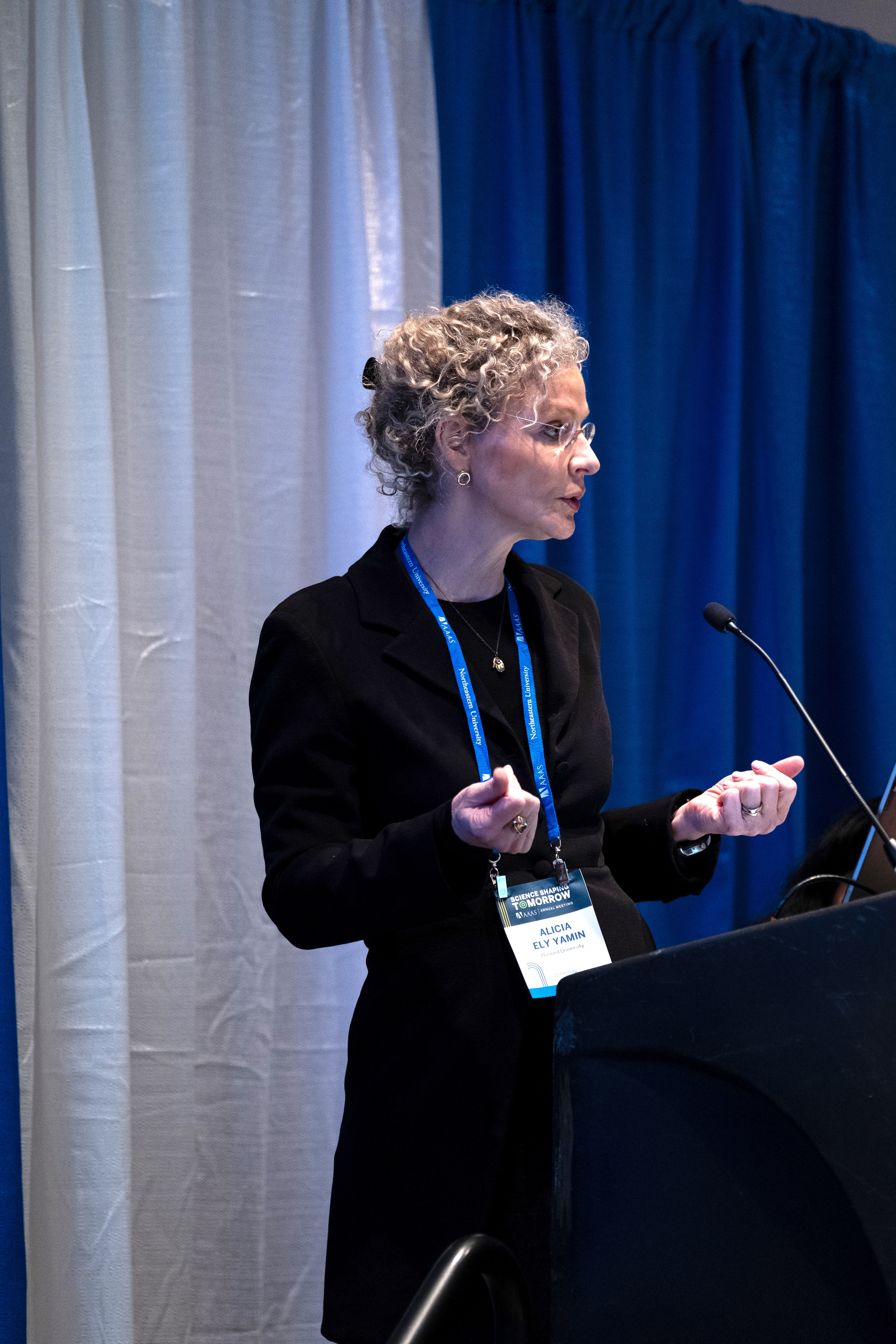
- Yamin speaking at the American Association for the Advancement of Science 2025 conference in Boston
- Known for: Applying human rights frameworks to health, and in particular maternal, sexual and reproductive health; Right to health litigation and judicial enforcement of health-related rights; Co-founding the health rights program at APRODEH in Peru; Building field of economic and social rights, especially the right to health
- Awards: Echoing Green Foundation Fellowship (1991-93); “Smart Cookie” Award for global work on maternal mortality as a human rights issue; Joseph H. Flom Fellowship on Global Health and Human Rights (2007-2009, renewed 2009-2011); Fulbright Senior Specialist (2019-2025)
- Scientific career
- Fields: Health and human rights; International law; Reproductive justice; Global health
- Workplaces: Harvard Law School; Harvard T.H. Chan School of Public Health; Partners In Health; Georgetown University Law Center; Columbia University Mailman School of Public Health; Physicians for Human Rights; Bergen Center on Law and Social Transformation

Academic background
- Education: Harvard College (A.B.); Harvard Law School (J.D.); Harvard T.H. Chan School of Public Health (M.P.H.); Universidad de Buenos Aires (Ph.D.)

Academic work
- Notable works: When Misfortune Becomes Injustice: Evolving Struggles for Health and Social Equality; Power, suffering and the Struggle for Dignity: Human Rights Frameworks for Health and Why They Matter
- Website: petrieflom.law.harvard.edu/about/bio/yamin-alicia

Alicia Ely Yamin is an American socio-legal and global health scholar-author, and human rights activist. As of 2026, Yamin is a lecturer on law and Director of the Global Health and Rights Project at the Petrie-Flom Center for Health Law Policy, Biotechnology, and Bioethics at Harvard Law School. Previously she was on the faculty of the Harvard TH Chan School of Public Health (2011-2026). She is also Research Leader, Gender, Sexuality and the Law at the Centre on Law and Social Transformation in Norway.

Yamin's career has combined fieldwork in multiple countries, advocacy and scholarship in relation to health-related rights. She served as Director of Research and Investigations at Physicians for Human Rights; and as Senior Adviser on Human Rights and Health Policy at Partners In Health.

As chief consultant to the UN Office of the High Commissioner for Human Rights, Yamin drafted the first human rights-based approach to health to be approved through an inter-governmental process at the UN Human Rights Council in 2012: "Technical Guidance on the Application of a Human Rights-Based Approach to the Implementation of Policies and Programmes to Reduce Preventable Maternal Morbidity and Mortality."

In 2016, the UN Secretary General appointed Yamin as one of the ten international experts to the Independent Accountability Panel (IAP) for the Global Strategy on Women's, Children's and Adolescents' Health in the Sustainable Development Goals.

Yamin has been appointed to numerous WHO and UN advisory groups and committees. She participated in the WHO Consultative Group that produced the report Making Fair Choices on the Path to Universal Health Coverage (2014) and contributed to the World Bank report, Open and Inclusive: Fair Processes for Financing Universal Health, both of which, among other things, advanced understandings of the need for meaningful participation to legitimate health financing and priority-setting processes.

In multiple countries, Yamin has advised high courts in relation to health rights cases. In 2011, Yamin was appointed by the Constitutional Court of Colombia as an independent expert to oversee implementation of Judgment T-760/08, a landmark ruling on the right to health. She has contributed expert testimony to the Inter-American Commission and Inter-American Court of Human Rights, including in Poblete Vilches v Chile (which established the independent justiciability of the right to health).

As of 2026 Yamin is a member of the Coordinating Committee of Defend Public Health, a volunteer-driven network of public health researchers, healthcare workers, advocates and allies fighting to protect public health, and the leadership council of Our Bodies, Ourselves.

== Education ==
Yamin graduated summa cum laude from Harvard College in 1987 with a double concentration in sociology and Latin American literature. She was elected to Phi Beta Kappa and received the Harvard College Award from 1984 to 1987. She earned her J.D. cum laude from Harvard Law School in 1991, where she served as executive editor of the Harvard Human Rights Journal. In 1996, she received a M.P.H. from the Harvard T.H. Chan School of Public Health, where she was awarded the Samdperil and François-Xavier Bagnoud Awards. She also holds a Ph.D. in law from the Universidad de Buenos Aires, which she completed in 2021 with the highest distinction (sobresaliente), focusing on international law.

== Career ==
After law school, Yamin received an Echoing Green Foundation Social Entrepreneurship Fellowship (1991–1993), during which she worked with the Comisión Mexicana de Defensa y Promoción de los Derechos Humanos, A.C., and as a legal analyst with Human Rights Watch's Americas Division in Mexico City. She practiced as an associate at Cleary Gottlieb Steen & Hamilton (1993–1995).

From 1996 to 2002, Yamin was an assistant professor of clinical public health and staff attorney at the Law and Policy Project at the Columbia University Mailman School of Public Health, where she worked with the Averting Maternal Death and Disability Program on maternal and reproductive health. In 1999, while still working at Columbia, she was living in Lima, Peru where she co-founded the Program on Human Rights in Health at the Asociación Pro Derechos Humanos (APRODEH) which contributed to the creation of a National Citizen Forum in Health across Peru as well as litigation and grassroots advocacy on health rights in Peru.

From 2005 to 2007, Yamin served as Director of Research and Investigations at Physicians for Human Rights, co-recipient of the 1997 Nobel Peace Prize. During Yamin’s tenure, PHR published investigations on the United States use of enhanced interrogation techniques, and the role of health professionals, as well as maternal health. Yamin argued for PHR to become the first international human rights organization to label the atrocities in Darfur during those years as genocide.

In 2007, Yamin was appointed the Joseph H. Flom Post Juris Doctor/Academic Fellow on Global Health and Human Rights at Harvard Law School, a fellowship she held until 2011, when she was appointed as the Policy Director at the Francois-Xavier Bagnoud Center, and Director of the Joint J.D./M.P.H. Program at the Harvard T.H. Chan School of Public Health. She lived in Dar es Salaam, Tanzania, from 2011 to 2014.

While based in East Africa, Yamin led a four-country study across Ethiopia, Tanzania, Malawi, and South Africa that combined quantitative and qualitative research methodologies to study the effects of maternal mortality on surviving children and families. The findings contributed to an evidence base for advocating changes in how governments with high maternal mortality rates prioritize reproductive health interventions. Yamin also supported the creation of an East African Health Rights Litigation Network that brought path-breaking litigation such as Petition 16, which established an enforceable right to maternal health in Uganda.

From 2020-2026, Yamin served as Senior Adviser on Human Rights and Health Policy for Partners In Health, where she represented PIH in efforts to create a network on Global Public Investment, and advocated for tax and debt justice, among other things.

During the COVID-19 pandemic, Yamin described the crisis as not only a global health emergency but a social, economic, and democratic inflection point. She argued that the pandemic exposed longstanding structural inequalities and presented a narrow opening to reimagine global solidarity and governance in health.

In 2025, she noted that although "President Trump has upended global governance for health since he took office for the second time, too much is at stake to allow the discourse to be defined by the reckless arsonists and those who merely seek to return to the status quo ante." In line with her writing and advocacy over decades, Yamin has called for critical responses to the new landscape of global governance that address structural constraints on global health equity, including meaningful global South leadership, tax reform and debt restructuring.

== International advisory roles ==
Yamin has served on several World Health Organization advisory bodies, including the Technical Advisory Group on Health Technology Assessments (2019–2023).

She was a member of the Lancet Commission on Global Health and the Law (2015–2019) and, since 2024, has served as a commissioner on the Lancet Commission on Global Governance for Health 2.0. She also sits on the Lancet-Dartmouth Commission on Arctic and Northern Health.

== Selected publications ==
=== Books ===
- When Misfortune Becomes Injustice: Evolving Human Rights Struggles for Health and Social Equality (Stanford University Press, 2020; 2nd revised and expanded edition, 2023)
- Power, Suffering and the Struggle for Dignity: Human Rights Frameworks for Health and Why They Matter (University of Pennsylvania Press, 2016)
- Yamin, Alicia Ely. El poder, el sufrimiento y la lucha por la dignidad: Los marcos de derechos humanos para la salud y por qué son importantes. Ediciones Uniandes-Universidad de los Andes, 2018.

=== Edited volumes ===
- Litigating Health Rights: Can Courts Bring More Justice to Health? (co-edited with Siri Gloppen, 2011)
- The MDGs, Capabilities and Human Rights: The Power of Numbers to Shape Agendas (co-edited with Sakiko Fukuda-Parr, 2015)
- Millennium Development Goals and Human Rights: Past, Present and Future (co-edited with Malcolm Langford and Andy Sumner, 2013)
- Learning to Dance: Case Studies on Advancing Women's Reproductive Health and Well-Being from the Perspectives of Public Health and Human Rights (Harvard Health and Human Rights Series, 2005)

== Board memberships ==
Yamin chaired the board of the Center for Economic and Social Rights from 2009 to 2015, having served as vice-chair since 2001. She co-chaired the International Steering Committee of the Global Public Investment Network (2022–2023). She has served on the board of directors of Physicians for Human Rights (1996–2001) and Mental Disability Rights International (now Disability Rights International; 2004–2009), and was a member of the Committee on Scientific Freedom and Responsibility at the American Association for the Advancement of Science (1999–2002). She is a founding member of the Global Health Law Consortium and serves as vice-chair of the Global Health Law Interest Group of the American Society of International Law.
