= Responses to the COVID-19 pandemic in December 2021 =

Sequence of major events in a virus pandemic

This article documents the chronology of the response to the COVID-19 pandemic in December 2021, which originated in Wuhan, China in December 2019. Some developments may become known or fully understood only in retrospect. Reporting on this pandemic began in December 2019.

== Reactions and measures in the United Nations ==
=== 17 December ===
- The World Health Organization issued an emergency use listing (EUL) for NVX-CoV2373, expanding the basket of WHO-validated vaccines against the SARS-CoV-2 virus.

=== 21 December ===
- World Health Organization Director-General Dr. Tedros Adhanom Ghebreyesus has urged people to cancel their holiday plans and remain at home for the Christmas holidays in order to combat the spread of the SARS-CoV-2 Omicron variant.

== Reactions and measures in Africa ==
=== 12 December ===
- Nigeria issues reciprocal flight bans to Argentina, Britain, Canada and Saudi Arabia.

== Reactions and measures in the Americas ==
=== 6 December ===
- Mayor of New York City Bill de Blasio has announced that all private employers in the city will be required to ensure that their workers are vaccinated against COVID-19 by 27 December 2021.

=== 12 December ===
- Peru increases the delay for the third vaccine dose to 3 months.

== Reactions and measures in Europe ==
=== 2 December ===
- German Chancellor Angela Merkel and Chancellor-designate Olaf Scholz have announced that German federal and state governments will impose various restrictions limiting most businesses and public venues to the vaccinated or recovered individuals, capacity limits at sports venues, and mask requirements at schools. In addition, the Bundestag will vote on legislation to introduce mandatory vaccination.

=== 13 December ===
- British Prime Minister Boris Johnson has declared an "Omicron emergency" and offered booster jabs to everyone above the age of 18 years in response to rising Omicron variant cases.

=== 16 December ===
- France has banned non-essential travel from the United Kingdom in response to the spread of the Omicron variant.

=== 18 December ===
- The Mayor of London Sadiq Khan declares a major incident in response to the rapid spread of Omicron cases in London.

=== 19 December ===
- The Netherlands reinstates lockdown restrictions in response to the spread of the Omicron variant.
- British Secretary of State for Health Sajid Javid has stated that the British Government will not rule out further lockdown restrictions prior to Christmas in order to combat the Omicron variant.

=== 20 December ===
- Germany has restricted travel from the United Kingdom, limiting entry to German nationals and UK residents residing in Germany. Denmark, France, Norway and Lebanon have also been added to Germany's "high risk list," restricting travel from those countries.

=== 21 December ===
- Germany increases the delay for the third vaccine dose to 3 months.

== Reactions and measures in South, East and Southeast Asia ==
=== 10 December ===
- Singapore's Health Sciences Authority approved the use of the Pfizer-BioNTech COVID-19 vaccine for children aged 5 to 11 with the first shots to be given by the end of the year, making Pfizer-BioNTech the first allowed for children. The use of booster shots is extended to individuals above 18 years of age starting from 14 December, with Pfizer-BioNTech's vaccine approved for full registration.

=== 16 December ===
The Malaysian Government has reinstated several COVID-19 restrictions including banning mass gatherings and requiring booster doses for high-risk groups in response to the country's second case of the Omicron variant.

=== 22 December ===
- The Chinese city of Xi'an has imposed a lockdown on residents to combat a COVID-19 outbreak that began on 9 December.

=== 28 December ===
- The Malaysian Government has lifted a travel ban on travelers from South Africa, Zimbabwe, Mozambique, Malawi, Botswana, Eswatini, Lesotho and Namibia. The Government has also reduced the interval between primary and booster shots to three months.

== Reactions and measures in the Western Pacific ==
=== 1 December ===
- New Zealand's COVID-19 Response Minister Chris Hipkins has announced that the Pfizer-BioNTech COVID-19 vaccine will be rolled out for children aged 5 to 11 years from late January 2022.

=== 13 December ===
- New Zealand Prime Minister Jacinda Ardern has announced that Auckland and all other "red" regions excluding Northland will move to the "orange" setting of the COVID-19 Protection Framework at 11.59pm on 30 December.

=== 15 December ===
- The Victorian state government has allowed unvaccinated individuals to visit retail shops but must wear face masks.

== See also ==
- Timeline of the COVID-19 pandemic in December 2021
- Responses to the COVID-19 pandemic
