= Adam Levine (disambiguation) =

Adam Levine (born 1979) is an American singer, songwriter, multi-instrumentalist, actor, and television personality.

Adam Levin(e) may also refer to:

- Adam Levine (press aide) (born 1969), former Bush Administration aide
- Adam Levin (born 1976/77), American fiction author
- Adam C. Levine, American physician and professor
- Adam K. Levin, former director of the New Jersey Division of Consumer Affairs and businessman for consumer credit related businesses
