= Power, Suffering, and the Struggle for Dignity =

2016 book by Alicia Ely Yamin

- Author: Alicia Ely Yamin
- Language: English
- Series: Pennsylvania Studies in Human Rights
- Subject: Human rights; right to health
- Genre: Non-fiction
- Publisher: University of Pennsylvania Press
- Publication date: 2016
- Media type: Print (hardcover and paperback) and e-book
- Pages: 336
- ISBN: 978-0-8122-4774-9
- Followed by: When Misfortune Becomes Injustice (2020)

Power, Suffering, and the Struggle for Dignity: Human Rights Frameworks for Health and Why They Matter is a 2016 book by American legal scholar and global health advocate Alicia Ely Yamin. The work was published by the University of Pennsylvania Press, as part of its Pennsylvania Studies in Human Rights series, with a foreword by Paul Farmer. Based on more than two decades of Yamin's legal, advocacy, and work in Latin America, Africa, and South Asia, it argues that patterns of health and suffering reflect power relations as much as biological or behavioural factors, and that applying a human rights framework to health requires rethinking conventional human rights practice and conventional public health and medical practice. Yamin applies the framework to accountability, participation, equality, and obligations beyond borders.

== Spanish translation ==
A Spanish edition translated by Carlos F. Morales de Setien Ravina appeared in 2018 under the title El poder, el sufrimiento y la lucha por la dignidad: Los marcos de derechos humanos para la salud y por qué son importantes, published in Bogotá by the Faculty of Law of Universidad de los Andes as part of its Estudios Académicos series. In 2025 the title was reissued in open access through the Faculty's Derecho Abierto initiative.

== Author ==
Yamin has described the book as a response to what she saw as a tendency in the field to reduce human rights-based approaches to health into technocratic recipes that did little to alter the underlying power relations shaping health outcomes, and as an effort to broaden the conversation beyond specialists in law and public health. The book, she argues, departs from the detached register of conventional legal and public health scholarship and opens with a personal account of Yamin's own miscarriage in New York and her near-simultaneous encounter, on a fact-finding mission to Chiapas, Mexico, with an indigenous woman hemorrhaging at the same stage of pregnancy under conditions that nearly killed her. Yamin uses the contrast between the two outcomes to introduce the book's central claim that the difference between recoverable and fatal suffering is rarely a matter of fate but of the social, political, and economic arrangements that human rights frameworks can be used to interrogate and reshape.

== Summary ==
Written in a first-person voice, Yamin combines autobiographical narrative with legal analysis and social theory. Each chapter starts with an individual story, many of them about maternal mortality and sexual and reproductive health and rights, which Yamin considers as the domain where inequities within and between countries become most visible.

After a foreword by Paul Farmer, the book is divided into two parts. Part I, "Starting Points," starts with a chapter linking dignity to freedom from suffering using Kant's thesis that human beings must be treated as ends and not means. Yamin rejects any rigid separation between public-sphere violence by the state and private-sphere violence in families and communities, holding that both breach bodily and moral integrity and can be internalised by those subject to them. The second chapter recasts extreme poverty as a rights violation rather than misfortune, rejecting the biomedical picture of autonomous individuals and treating social determinants of health as determining causes rather than background conditions. The final chapter, building on the work of Lynn Freedman, presents health systems as core social institutions that encode values of social citizenship, equity, and dignity rather than neutral delivery mechanisms; the principal case examined is the 2008 restructuring of the Colombian health system by the Colombian Constitutional Court.

Part II covers four elements of application. On accountability, Yamin proposes a "circle of accountability" spanning the full policy cycle. She treats judicial review, social accountability, and indicator-based monitoring as complementary rather than competing mechanisms. On participation, following Paulo Freire, she argues that state-managed participation can mask asymmetries of power. Meaningful participation, she holds, requires fostering critical consciousness and confronting internalised domination. The chapter on equality and non-discrimination starts with the death of Nomkhosi, a young South African woman with a disability who died of post-caesarean complications. It distinguishes formal from substantive equality, and holds that a human rights framework requires the latter. The closing chapter addresses obligations beyond borders. It traces the effects of donor priorities around the Millennium Development Goals, transnational corporations, illicit financial flows, and IMF and World Bank structural adjustment programmes on health outcomes in countries such as Tanzania and Ghana. Yamin argues for extraterritorial legal obligations on wealthy states and international financial institutions.

In the concluding chapter, Yamin recounts two encounters: Daniel, a boy in a Buenos Aires psychiatric hospital during Argentina's 2001 crisis, and David, a prominent Ugandan human rights lawyer running an orphanage and vocational school where he himself grew up. She casts human rights work as institutional reconstruction rather than revolution, and argues the framework calls on readers "to make a different world, and to make ourselves different in the process."

== Reception ==
Writing the book's foreword, Paul Farmer praised Yamin as someone who "has been in the trenches" and credited her with showing "what a human rights framework can and should mean." For him, the book sits within his own conception of the "pathologies of power." Farmer thought that it illustrated the "core purpose of a human rights-based approach [as] eradicating the suffering arising from dramatic inequality within and between nations". Farmer further described the work as achieving an accessibility rare in academic literature. He argued that the world the book pointed toward was not a newly envisioned one but the order imagined when the Universal Declaration of Human Rights was drafted.

Audrey R. Chapman described the book as "an angry book" that departs from conventional scholarly form by working through autobiography and narrative rather than dispassionate legal analysis. She praised the chapters on accountability and on power and participation. For Chapman, Yamin's treatment of "internalized domination" was a notable contribution to thinking about meaningful participation.

Paul Hunt, a former UN Special Rapporteur on the right to health, compared the recurring objections to economic, social, and cultural rights to the heads of a Hydra, and argued the book's readership should extend well beyond health and human rights specialists. He identified the analysis of power as its "most radical contribution," and pointed to the chapters on participation and extraterritorial obligations as particular strengths.

Maria Tanyag praised the book's personal register and its reframing of health from charity to accountability. She argued, however, that Yamin's analysis implies a linear progress narrative that sits uneasily with the contestation and rollback SRHR has faced from religious fundamentalist forces.

Jackie Dugard called the writing "profoundly rich, textured and compassionate" yet "rigorously analytical and intellectual." She read the book as a call for a radical reading of human rights against power and privilege. Part I, thought Dugard, was as analytical as Part II—engaging Ronald Dworkin, Paulo Freire, Immanuel Kant, Steven Lukes, Martha Nussbaum, Thomas Pogge, John Rawls, and Amartya Sen.

Desmond McNeill called it "an impressive work" that traced suffering from the individual to global economic and political structures.
