= Pkhakadze =

Pkhakadze (Georgian: ფხაკაძე) is a Georgian surname. Notable people with the surname include:

- Omar Pkhakadze (1944–1993), Georgian sprint cyclist
- Tamri Pkhakadze (born 1957), Georgian writer, playwright, children's author and translator
- Giorgi Pkhakadze (born 1976), Georgian doctor, public health expert, public figure, civil society activists, Professor of public health and epidemiology, published scientific papers and books in the field of public health, anthropology, accreditation of healthcare facilities
