= When Misfortune Becomes Injustice =

2020 book by Alicia Ely Yamin

When Misfortune Becomes Injustice: Evolving Human Rights Struggles for Health and Social Equality
- Cover
- Author: Alicia Ely Yamin
- Language: English
- Series: Stanford Studies in Human Rights
- Subject: Human rights, global health governance, the right to health, and social equality
- Genre: Non-fiction
- Publisher: Stanford University Press
- Publication date: July 4, 2023
- Media type: Print (hardback and paperback); e-book
- ISBN: 9781503635944

When Misfortune Becomes Injustice: Evolving Human Rights Struggles for Health and Social Equality is a 2020 book by American legal scholar and global health advocate Alicia Ely Yamin. The book was first published in 2020, part of the Stanford Studies in Human Rights series. Stanford University Press published a much expanded second edition in 2023 which covers the lessons of the COVID-19 pandemic.

Yamin traces the development of health as a human rights concern from the 1970s through the COVID-19 pandemic, using case studies and her own experiences in advocacy, law, and global health to investigate the relationship between health rights, democracy, inequality, and global economic governance.

A Korean translation of the first edition was published in Korean in 2022.

== Author ==
Yamin is a scholar-activist who, as of 2026, teaches at Harvard University but has lived and worked on four continents and weaves her personal experiences into the book's analysis. In a 2023 symposium interview at the University of Ottawa, Yamin explained that she wrote the book as a historically structured account of evolving struggles over health and social equality over roughly the past 50 years, told through country-based chapters and human stories and synthesizing law, public health, economics, and development. She said the first edition was published just before COVID-19 was declared a pandemic, and she later produced a second edition after Stanford University Press invited her to revise it in light of lessons from the pandemic, which she used to reweave the book's arguments while drawing on her own lived and working experience across regions.

== Summary ==
Yamin traces the emergence of health as a human rights concern during the Post World War II period, but focuses especially on the period from the 1970s to the COVID-19 era, linking the development of health rights doctrine and advocacy to changes in national politics and the global economy. Yamin argues that many forms of avoidable illness and premature death come to be treated as "misfortune" when responsibility is obscured by institutional design, market rules, and social hierarchies. She examines how rights-based movements and institutions have recast such conditions as injustices requiring remedies.

Yamin begins with the rise of modern human rights politics after episodes of authoritarian violence. She uses Argentina's dictatorship as a point of departure. She shows how early human rights work focused on civil and political violations and how later debates extended to economic, social, and cultural rights, including health. Yamin also addresses the limits of public/private distinctions in international and domestic law and policy, examining their specific effects on women's health, reproductive autonomy, and responses to gender-based violence.

In the 1980s, the turn toward neoliberal economic policies and the spread of structural adjustment reshaped ideas about state responsibility and welfare provision. Within this context, the HIV/AIDS epidemic emerged as a central case for how social movements pushed governments and international actors to treat access to prevention and treatment as matters of entitlement rather than charity, while also exposing the role of stigma and the medicalization of illness.

In the 1990s, the rights-centered language and consensus-building of major UN conferences stood in contrast to the legal and institutional expansion of trade and investment regimes. Using examples from Mexico and Peru, Yamin documents how modernization projects often excluded rural and indigenous communities and how state health policies (including coercive family planning) could combine technocratic targets with entrenched racial and gender hierarchies. In these chapters, the author emphasizes how health systems can operate as sites where broader social power relations are reproduced, and how rights claims are translated into local politics, institutions, and legal strategies.

The 2000s and 2010s saw the expansion of global health governance and the growth of health rights adjudication. Yamin discusses struggles over access to medicines in Southern Africa, including conflicts over intellectual property rules, and assesses the MDG period's reliance on targets and indicators alongside the uneven development of accountability mechanisms. She investigates the rise of health rights litigation, not just in the South African example but also in Latin America where there have been prominent debates over "judicialization," or judicial enforcement of health rights. In the final chapters, the COVID-19 pandemic serves as a framework for Yamin to illuminate connections between health systems, inequality, democracy, and global cooperation (and to weigh proposals for transforming the economic and legal frameworks that shape access to health-related knowledge, technologies, and public investment).

== Reviews ==
In his endorsement of the book, Paul Farmer wrote that "Yamin draws on years of practical field experience to speak with unique authority among human rights scholar about the global and national dynamics that systematically produce poverty and health inequalities across the world."

In her review, the director of the Harvard Global Health Institute Louise C. Ivers considered the text a call to action that serves as an "antidote to resignation" for practitioners facing entrenched health inequities. She found the fusion of personal testimony and historical evidence compelling. Ivers underscored how the book confronts the unequal costs of medical advancement without sliding into despair.

In his review in the Lancet, Rajat Khosla, human rights lawyer and the executive director of the Partnership for Maternal, Newborn and Child Health (PMNCH, as of 2026), praised the work as a compelling account that pairs personal stories of suffering with rigorous political economy analysis. Khosla emphasized how Yamin centered human lives to expose the gap between lofty human rights norms and lived realities shaped by neocolonial structures and neoliberal governance. The stories ranged from Latonya and Janet (affected in very different ways by economic policies in the contexts of the United States and Tanzania, respectively) to Alyne da Silva Pimentel Teixeira, whose preventable maternal death in Brazil illustrated systemic failures. Khosla considered the book's acknowledgement of law as a necessary tool for social transformation while acknowledging its limitations to be important for understanding developments in the health and human rights movement. Khosla heartily agreed with Yamin's argument that strong social movements remain essential to demanding, implementing, and sustaining change in an era of shrinking political space and rising authoritarianism.

American human rights lawyer and policy adviser Rebecca Riddell called the book "excellent" and described it as an informed, engaging, and deeply insightful stocktaking of limited but real advancements in the right to health. She read it as a damning critique of the political economy that produced decades of structural adjustment, austerity, and privatization. She valued the author's ability to be nuanced but not neutral. But, she also argued that some critics of human rights might find this posture too close to an insider's defense of the tools and mechanisms in the field.

Alexandra Reichert praised the book as both explanatory and evocative. The book prompted her to consider the future role of transnational actors in advancing women's health rights. She echoed Yamin's own measured conclusion: the history of using human rights to advance social equity has offered "evidence for hope, but not enough."

In a review in Human Rights Quarterly, law professor Katharine Young situated Yamin's book within a broader feminist intellectual tradition. Although the title is explicitly taken from a line in a South African Constitutional Court opinion that argues "it is precisely the function of constitutional protection to convert misfortune that is to be endured into injustice to be remedied," Young saw resonance with Judith Shklar's 1988 distinction between misfortune and injustice. Young praised the book as a useful counterexample to critics who fault human rights advocates for ignoring neoliberalism. Young noted that while readers might quibble with the eclecticism, the approach served Yamin's context-sensitive, globally attuned aims.

American medical anthropologist Tsitsi B. Masvawure praised the work for its integration of diverse fields such as law, gender studies, and economics. This, thought Masvawure, made the text appealing to a broad audience while at the same time challenging for those lacking background knowledge. She described the content on women's dignity as sobering. The analysis of how professionalization and measurement indicators often failed to challenge pathologies of power struck her as an important contribution.

Raúl Márquez Porras described the book as a journey through half a century of struggle for the recognition of human rights in their social, economic, and cultural dimensions.
