= Partnership for Maternal, Newborn & Child Health =

Organization

The Partnership for Maternal, Newborn & Child Health
- Abbreviation: PMNCH
- Formation: 2005 (21 years ago)
- Legal status: Active
- Location: Geneva, Switzerland
- Key people: Helen Clark (Chair); Helga Fogstad (Executive Director)
- Website: pmnch.who.int

Established in 2005, The Partnership for Maternal, Newborn & Child Health (PMNCH) is the world's largest alliance for women's, children's and adolescents' health and well-being, with more than 1,400 partner organizations working together through 10 constituency groups: partner governments, donors and foundations, NGOs, adolescent and youth groups, private sector organizations, health professional associations, academic and research institutions, global financing mechanisms, inter-governmental organizations, and UN agencies. PMNCH is hosted by the World Health Organization, based in Geneva.

== Organization ==
=== Constituencies ===
PMNCH brings together more than 1,250 partner organizations across 10 constituencies. Members collaborate through PMNCH to advance sexual, reproductive, maternal, newborn, child and adolescent health. PMNCH constituencies align objectives and resources, for effective policies, financing and service delivery to advance the agenda on women's children's and adolescents' health and well-being, leaving no one behind.

=== Funding ===
Since 2009, PMNCH has received funding from the Bill & Melinda Gates Foundation, the Children's Investment Fund Foundation, Johnson & Johnson, MacArthur Foundation, UNICEF, U.S. Fund for UNICEF and the World Bank.

== History ==
PMNCH was launched in September 2005, when 80 organizations belonging to the Partnership for Safe Motherhood and Newborn Health, the Healthy Newborn Partnership and the Child Survival Partnership joined forces. By uniting and working as one partnership they could do more to accelerate action by partners and countries to achieve Millennium Development Goals (MDGs) 4 (reduce child mortality) and 5 (improve maternal health).

The vision and goals of the new partnership—The Partnership for Maternal, Newborn & Child Health (PMNCH) —were outlined in "The Delhi Declaration" – a landmark statement developed by participants of "Lives in the Balance: The Partnership Meeting for Maternal, Newborn and Child Health", held in New Delhi, India, 7–9 April 2005.

In 2015, the Every Woman Every Child Global Strategy for Women's, Children's and Adolescents' Health was launched to reflect the shift from the MDGs to the Sustainable Development Goals. The updated Global Strategy, which has guided PMNCH's work since 2016, takes a more holistic view of health, moving beyond survival to well-being and social transformation.

More than 15 years since PMNCH was launched, the organization has undergone a significant rebranding in name (it is now referred to simply as PMNCH) and appearance.

== See also ==
- Independent Accountability Panel
