= Kesetebirhan Admasu =

Ethiopian physician and politician

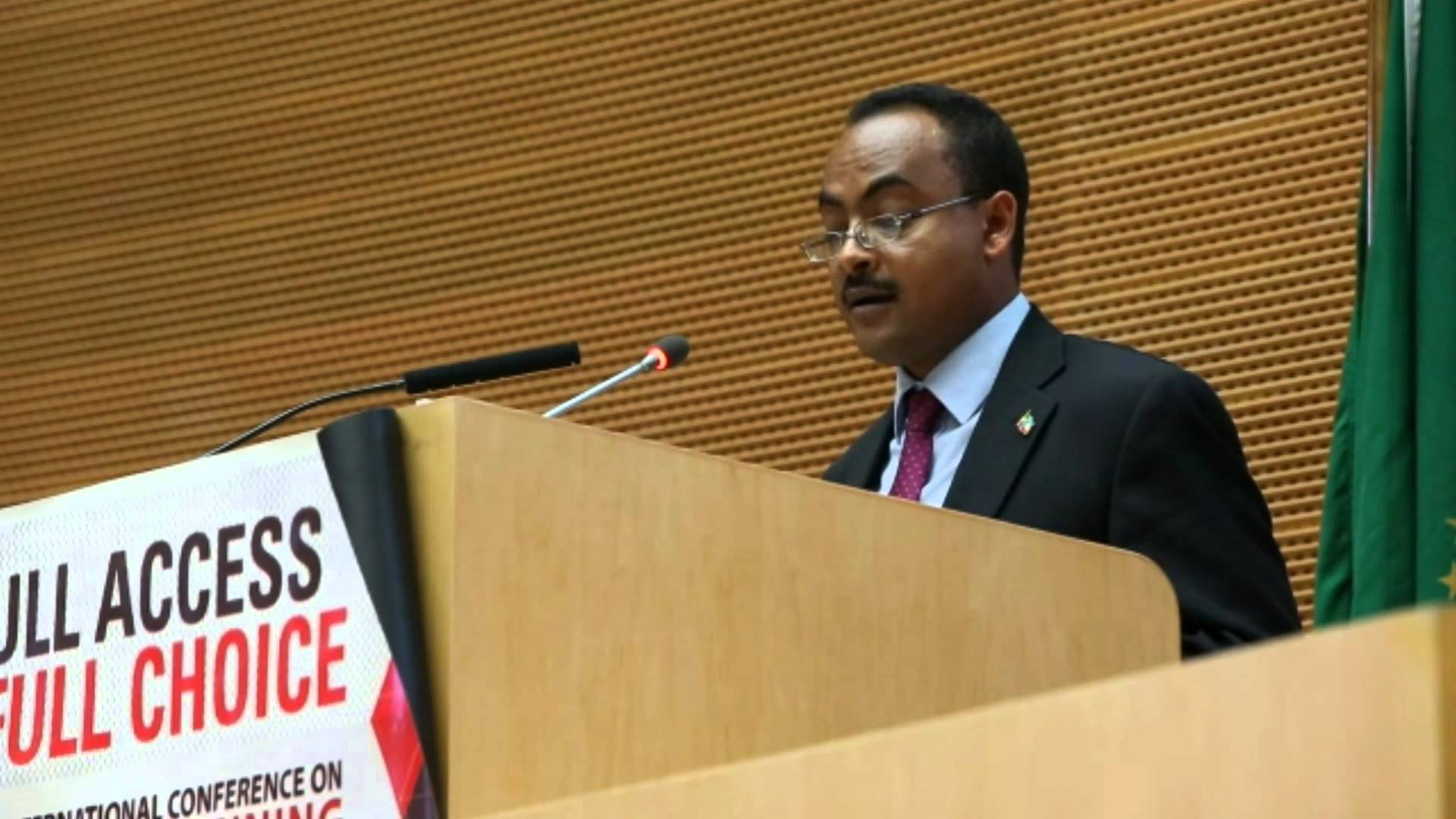
Dr Kesete Admasu

Kesetebirhan (Kesete) Admasu is an Ethiopian physician who was the Minister of Health of Ethiopia between November 2012 and 2016. It was reported that he left the government after declining a new non-health cabinet ministerial portfolio during a cabinet reshuffle in November 2016. He was appointed as Minister of Health in October 2012 after serving as State Minister in charge of Health Programs from 2010 to October 2012. He is known for his role in implementing the health sector reform of the country when he was Director General, Health Promotion and Disease Prevention between 2007 and 2010. Kesete has been appointed as chief executive officer of the Roll Back Malaria Partnership in February-2017.

== Early life and education ==
Kesete was born and raised in Addis Ababa, in a neighborhood called Cherkos. He attended Felege Yordanos Primary School and Abyot Kirs (aka GCA) secondary school. He was trained in the University of Gondar College of Medical Sciences for both his Doctor of Medicine and Master of Public Health degrees.

== Career ==
=== Key achievements ===
Kesete is a champion of innovation, task-shifting, and implementation at large scale. He has been a staunch advocate for maternal health and child health and led the national roll-out of a single rod contraceptive implant through the use of community health workers that resulted in 2 million women using the method. He also coordinated the national scale up of integrated community case management of childhood illnesses to improve access to life saving interventions. These efforts led to the reduction of child mortality by two-thirds between 1990 and 2015 and help Ethiopia to achieve the Millennium Development Goals targets. He has led the implementation of the reformed family code that helped reduce clandestine abortion and its contribution to high maternal mortality and played a pivotal role in abolishing user fees and provision of free maternal services in all public health facilities. He was nominated by Melinda Gates for the 2016 Global 120 under 40 Leaders of Family Planning award

Kesete is a globally recognized leader in the fight against neglected tropical diseases. He was the architect of the Addis Ababa commitment on NTDs, which has been endorsed by more than 26 countries. Under his leadership, Ethiopia has developed a national roadmap to end the scourge of NTDs by 2020. He is particularly known for the Ministerial Initiative he has launched to reduce the surgical backlog of patients with trachoma. The overarching aim of his initiative is to end blinding trachoma in Ethiopia by 2020. Through this ministerial initiative, in less than two years nearly 300,000 patients have already undergone TT surgery and averted avoidable blindness.

Under the leadership of Admasu, Ethiopia made huge strides in improving availability of safe blood. In 2012, the amount of blood collected was about 50, 000 units, in which only 27% were collected from voluntary donors and the rest from family replacements. This has increased to nearly 140,000 units and 97% of the blood is collected from voluntary donors. The establishment of the National Blood Bank and Transfusion Services by council of Ministers regulation in 2013 provided the platform for the transition of the blood transfusion service from Ethiopian Red Cross Society to the Ministry of Health. Minister Kesete's close follow up is credited for smooth transition and big improvement in voluntary blood collection.

Kesete realized his vision of establishing an international institute for primary healthcare in Ethiopia which is closely linked to the famous health extension program. The institute was officially launched in January 2016 and has the mission of providing training in primary healthcare, grounded in exposure to fieldwork, and dedicated to expanding and strengthening of PHC programs at scale throughout Africa and beyond. The international institute will collaborate with the Johns Hopkins University Bloomberg School of Public Health and is based within the Ethiopian Public Health Institute in Addis Ababa. The International Institute for PHC will assist other countries in the design and implementation of PHC programs at scale, aiming to accelerate the improvement of the health of populations in sub-Saharan Africa and beyond.

Kesete is known for championing and introducing innovations to improve the quality and equity of health services. The Clean and Safe Health Facility (CASH) initiative, with the objective of making health facilities safe and comfortable for patients, attendants and health workers, has been launched by him. CASH is transforming hospitals across the country. Another notable innovation Kesete has championed is the guidance and scaling up of an Audit-able Pharmaceutical Transaction Service (APTS), which is a local innovation, started in Debre Markos Referral Hospital and grown in Axum St Mary Hospital and in other hospitals of the country. APTS is a data driven package of interventions designed to transform the pharmaceutical supply chain in general and pharmacy services at health facilities. The system improves patient knowledge on correct dosage, decrease waiting time and increase care time. It establish accountable, transparent and responsible supply chain and pharmacy practices enabling the Audit Bureau and regulatory authority to easily audit, trace and control products from theft, pilferage and illegal diversion. It helps supply chain organizations and health facilities to optimize utilization of medicines budget, improve access to affordable medicines, and decrease wastage. APTS standardizes and continuously monitors the number, mix & performance of supply and pharmacy service workforce. It also standardizes customer service premise design and workflow. Through improving recording and documentation, it generates reliable and consistent information for decision making and control for regulatory authority. As a result, APTS improves overall quality of the supply chain and pharmacy services thereby increasing patient knowledge on correct dosage and satisfaction for customers. APTS improves quality of pharmaceutical services, brings transparency, accountability and efficiency in health facilities through effective recording and reliable information. Ultimately it contributes to better health outcomes. from 2011 to June 2019, more than 200 health facilities have implemented APTS with dramatic improvement in availability of medicines and reduced wastage. During the inception of APTS, Kesete and creator of APTS, discussed on the issue while they were in Adama for workshop developing manuals of “code of Ethics” for various health professions in Ethiopia. They discussed on the content of APTS, advantages and how to implement the system and Kesete advised the creator on how to go about it and what should it focus. Kesete decided to implement it at Amanuel Hospital and to transfer the creator from ALERT hospital to Amanuel Hospital, since he was the then CEO of the Amanuel hospital. But fortunately, soon he was promoted to be the health minister of the country so that he got opportunity to implement it nationally. He was leading implementation of the new system-APTS nationally, monitoring every month with very detailed knowledge of APTS. The new system, APTS, is incorporated in a level four pharmacy pre-service training curriculum in Ethiopia with significant credit hours. APTS is also included in the graduate level (master's degree) training of pharmacy management in Wollo University. The principles of APTS have potential to be scaled up to and beyond Ethiopia - globally both for pharmacy services and supply chain. Generally, Kesete led and contributed a lot for the innovation, development and scale up of APTS.

Kesete has also demonstrated strong leadership to improve emergency medical system in Ethiopia by prioritizing human resource development, procurement of ambulances, training of EMTs, reforming the emergency departments, availing medical equipment to strengthen and establish ICUs, and instituting emergency coordination team. These intervention has tremendously improved access to emergency care across Ethiopia.

Before rejoining the Ministry of Health Kesete was chief executive officer of Amanuel Hospital-the only mental health hospital in the country- and played critical role in turning around the performance of the hospital into one of the best hospitals in the country. He has also decentralized mental health services into primary care and initiated and coordinated psychiatric training for nurses and clinical offices that has addressed the critical shortage of health workers in the field. Kesete has changed the course of mental health for the better in Ethiopia. The BSc level pre-service training program is now running in 5 universities and produce up to 400 mental health practitioners who are deployed to primary and secondary care level. The MSc training in clinical and community psychiatry is also producing up to 30 graduates every year who are serving as Non-Physician Psychiatrists. For these and other initiatives that brought substantial change in mental health, Kesete has been recognized by Ethiopian Psychiatric Association as outstanding leader in Mental Health in 2016. He also served the Ministry as Team Leader of Public Private Partnership and led the formation of partnership forums with health professional associations, civil society and the private sector.

=== International experience ===
Kesete is a prominent figure in global health. He is a leader in promoting primary health care and serves in a number of international advisory panels, which aims to promote CHWs. He was appointed to the Every Woman Every Child steering group by the UNSG that developed the EWEC strategy 1.0. He has also championed the promise renewed movement to end preventable child deaths by 2030. As a result, he successfully co-hosted a global call to action conferences in DC, Delhi and Addis, that mobilized global support to reposition child health in the context of SDG. He has also served in the FP2020 reference group. Kesete played a critical role in shaping up the Global Financing Facility for RMNCHA + N as he has been a member of the design group. He has been serving as a member of 'Investor Group' of the GFF. Kesete is a recognized global leader who demonstrated strong leadership in the fight against NTDS. He was the chair of APOC in its closing year and has successfully seen the creation of ESPEN. Kesete is a speaker in events at Women Deliver, IAS, ASTMH, CUGH, UNGA, CGI, AU, and many international fora.

== Other activities ==
- International Gender Champions (IGC), Member
- African Union Ministers of Health forum, Chair (2013)
- Intergovernmental Authority for Development Ministers of Health Forum, Chair (2013–2016)
- Partners in Population Development, Member (2012 to 2016)'
- GAVI Alliance, Member of the Board (2014 -2016)
- African Union Center for Disease Control Board, Chair (2016)
- CEPI, Member of the Interim Board (2016)
- WHO-Afro, Chair of the Regional Committee (2016)
- Board Member Hailemariam and Roman Foundation (2019)
