= Independent Accountability Panel =

Official logo

The UN Secretary-General’s Independent Accountability Panel (IAP) is the only fully independent accountability mechanism established by the United Nations on women's, children's and adolescent health under the 2030 agenda for sustainable development. Founded in 2015 under a mandate by the United Nations Secretary-General, it provides an independent review of progress on the implementation of the Global Strategy for Women's, Children's and Adolescents’ Health (2016–30) − from the specific lens of who is accountable to whom, for what and how. It is composed of an autonomous group of internationally recognized experts and leaders appointed by the UN Secretary-General in 2016. The IAP is hosted by the Partnership for Maternal, Newborn & Child Health (PMNCH) based at the World Health Organization in Geneva, Switzerland.

== The Accountability Framework ==
The IAP framework builds on the framework previously used by the Commission on Information and Accountability (CoIA) and the independent Expert Review Group (iERG), but draws on international human rights law, which lies at the core of the Global Strategy and is set out in instruments accepted by states through intergovernmental processes. The IAP extends the monitor, review and act framework articulated by CoIA to monitor, review, act and remedy. This framework recognizes existing legal accountability mechanisms at national level (e.g. courts and national human rights institutions, and others already listed in the revised Global Strategy, such as parliamentarians, civil society organizations, development partners and private sector actors) and international level (e.g. UN treaty- monitoring bodies, regional bodies and the UN Human Rights Council's Universal Periodic Review). Including act and remedy makes the accountability framework consistent with the 2030 Agenda for Sustainable Development, which notably sets out the importance of rule of law and access to justice to achieve sustainable peace and development (Sustainable Development Goal 16). This includes equal access to justice for all, and developing effective, accountable and inclusive institutions at all levels.

== Membership ==
IAP Co-Chairs and Members are appointed by the UN Secretary-General. They serve in their individual capacities and represent diverse regions and disciplines – from legal, human rights and health specialists to government representatives, statisticians and academics, and civil society representatives, including from the women's and youth movements.

The IAP is composed of the following members:

- Joy Phumaphi (Botswana), co-chair
- Elizabeth Mason (UK), co-chair
- Nicholas Kojo Alipui (Ghana)
- Carol Kidu (Papua New Guinea)
- Brenda Killen (Ireland)
- Giorgi Pkhakadze (Georgia)
- Jovana Rios Cisnero (Panama)
- Gita Sen (India)
- Alicia Ely Yamin (USA)
- Dakshitha Wickremarathne (Sri Lanka)
- Winfred Lichuma (Kenya)
- Carmen Barosso (Brazil)
- Kul Gautham (Nepal)
- Pali Lehohla (South Africa)

== Reports ==
The IAP's inaugural report, 2016: Old Challenges, New Hopes.

The 2017 report, Transformative Accountability for Adolescents, with Summary of Recommendations available in English, Arabic, French, Russian and Spanish.

The 2018 report,Private Sector: Who is Accountable? for women’s, children’s and adolescents’ health, with the Summary of Recommendations available in English, Arabic, French, Russian and Spanish.

IAP did not release a report in 2019.

The 2020 report,Caught in the COVID-19 Storm: women's, children's and adolescents' health in the context of UHC and the SDGs, with Summary of Recommendations available in English, Arabic, Chinese, French, Russian, and Spanish.
