= Adam C. Levine =

American physician and professor

Adam C. Levine is an American researcher and professor of emergency medicine and human rights at Brown University. He holds appointments in Brown's Alpert Medical School, Watson School of Policy, and School of Public Health.

== Education and training ==
Adam C. Levine was trained as a physician: He studied at the University of Southern California, from which he received bachelor's degrees in creative writing and biomedical engineering, before attending medical school at the University of California, San Francisco, from 2000 to 2004. While studying at UCSF, he also received a Master of Public Health degree from the University of California, Berkeley. He completed a residency in emergency medicine at Brigham and Women’s Hospital and Massachusetts General Hospital from 2005 to 2009. Levine is also a Fellow of the American College of Emergency Physicians.

== Career ==
Levine has been a staff physician at Rhode Island Hospital since 2009, and worked at The Miriam Hospital in the same role from 2009 to 2015. From 2009 to 2016, he was also an assistant professor of emergency medicine at the Brown University Warren Alpert Medical School; from 2016 until 2021 he was an associate professor. Since 2021, Levine has been a full professor of emergency medicine at the medical school and held a secondary appointment in the health services, policy and practice department at the Brown University School of Public Health. Within Brown University Health, he is a faculty member in the Center for International Health Research.

Levine has directed several programs and initiatives during his career at Brown, such as university centers on human rights and global health. He served as inaugural director of the Watson School of International and Public Affairs' Center for Human Rights and Humanitarian Studies from its founding in 2019 until he was succeeded by Ieva Jusionyte in 2025. He remains a faculty affiliate of the center.

In 2023, Levine was named the associate director of Brown's Global Health Initiative. In 2024, he was made Associate Dean of Global Health Equity and director of the initiative; he began working to transform the initiative into the Center for Global Health Equity, which was created in 2025.

== Research and field practice ==
In 2014, Levine was an emergency responder to the West Africa Ebola outbreak. During the Ebola epidemic, he worked with international health colleagues to launch a treatment center in Bong County, Liberia. Ebola fighters were collectively named 2014 Time Person of the Year, a decision which Levine supported in a statement. In November 2019, Levine was a coauthor on a New England Journal of Medicine study that found two investigational therapeutics, mAb114 and REGN-EB3, more effective at increasing Ebola survival rates than two other treatments. The treatments were described as a cure for Ebola, and were said at the time to have the potential to end the epidemic should there be adequate infrastructure to administer. Levine is also a noted expert on Marburg virus, a relative of Ebola.

Following Hurricane Matthew in 2016, Levine managed an International Medical Corps health center in Les Anglais, Haiti, treating cholera cases.

During the COVID-19 pandemic, Levine leveraged his experience fighting the Ebola epidemic to guide the medical field on how to respond to COVID-19. Levine was among a team of health experts covered by WBUR searching for temporary hospital locations in March of 2020. He also gave a statement to U.S. News & World Report on tips for home isolation to decrease the spread of the virus. A 2023 study in Clinical Infectious Diseases by Levine and coauthors found that "convalescent plasma can be used as an effective and low-cost treatment both during the COVID-19 pandemic and in the inevitable pandemics of the future". According to Levine, the findings, discovered years into the pandemic, could have saved millions of lives if found earlier, but are nonetheless applicable to future disease outbreaks.

In 2023, Levine was quoted by NBC News as an expert on the risks of unclean drinking water in Gaza during the Gaza war.

== Personal life ==
Levine has a husband, whom he met at a dinner party in 2002.
