= David Nabarro =

British medical academic and civil servant (1949–2025)

Sir David Nabarro KCMG CBE
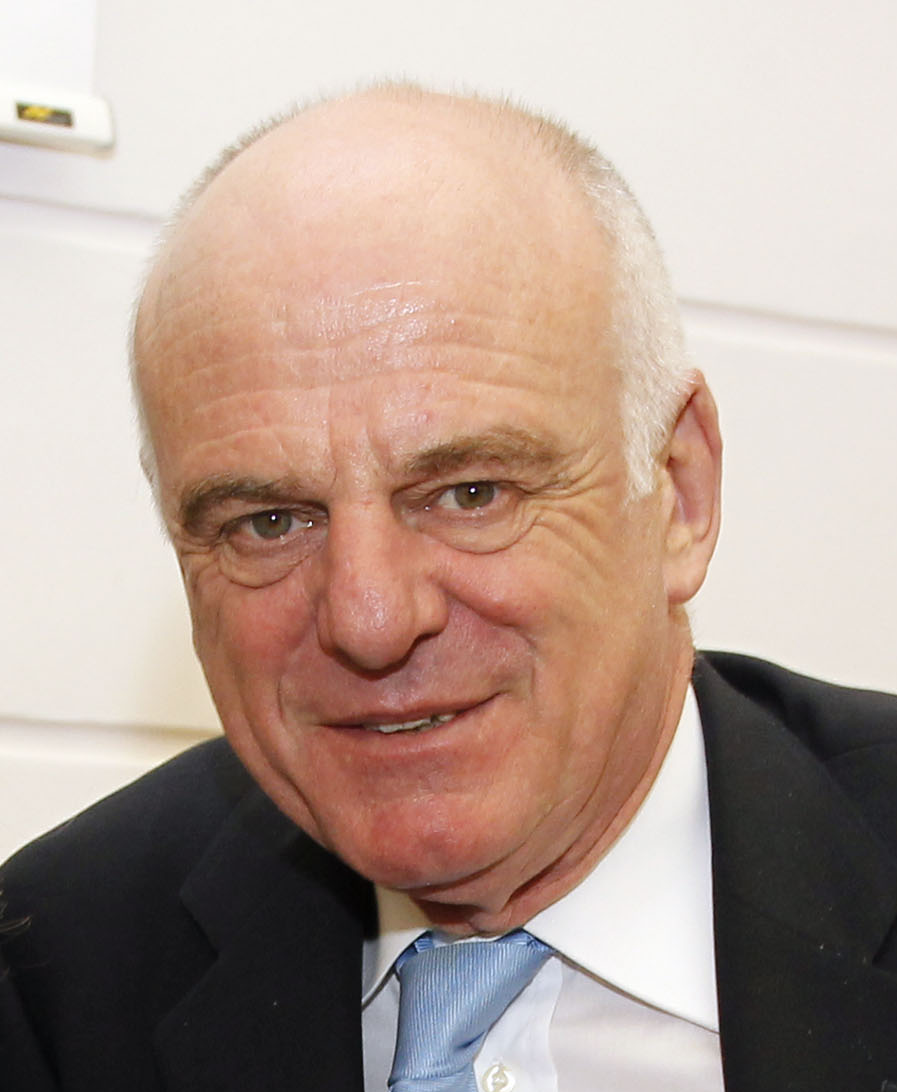
- Nabarro in 2016

Personal details
- Born: 26 August 1949 London, England
- Died: 25 July 2025 (aged 75) Ferney-Voltaire, France
- Education: Oundle School, University of Oxford (BA, MS, MBBS); University of London (MS)

Sir David Nunes Nabarro KCMG CBE (26 August 1949 – 25 July 2025) was a British Special Envoy on Covid-19 for the World Health Organization. He made his career in the international civil service, working for either the Secretary-General of the United Nations or the Director-General of the World Health Organization. From February 2020, he helped the DGWHO deal with the COVID-19 pandemic.

== Early life and education ==
Nabarro was the son of Sir John David Nunes Nabarro, whose cousin was Sir Gerald Nabarro, MP, and who was a consultant endocrinologist at University College Hospital (UCH) and Middlesex Hospital, London. David attended Oundle School in Northamptonshire, leaving in the summer of 1966.

In a gap year between school and university, Nabarro was a community service volunteer. He spent a year as the organiser of Youth Action, York. A BBC television documentary was made about his volunteer work.

David Nabarro was an undergraduate and postgraduate at Worcester College, Oxford, and went on to study clinical medicine at University College Hospital, University of London. He qualified as a physician in 1974. He was a member of the Faculty of Public Health (FPH) and the Royal College of Physicians by distinction (where he was also a Fellow).

== Career ==
=== Early career ===
Nabarro worked as a medical officer in North Iraq for Save the Children, before working as a junior NHS doctor in Northampton and Oxford. From 1976 to 1978, Nabarro worked for Save the Children Fund as Medical Officer in Dhankuta, Nepal. Later, he did an M.Sc in Nutrition and became a lecturer at the London School of Hygiene and Tropical Medicine. In 1982, he became Regional Manager for Save the Children Fund in South Asia, based in Kathmandu. In 1985 he joined the Liverpool School of Tropical Medicine as senior lecturer in International Community Health and helped Professor Ken Newell to set up a Master's course in Community Health.

After working in Iraq again to set up a Safe Havens project, David Nabarro moved to the Overseas Development Administration (now part of Foreign, Commonwealth and Development Office) as a strategic adviser for health and population in East Africa, based in Nairobi, in 1989.

He became chief health and population adviser at the Overseas Development Administration (London office) in 1990, and moved on to become director of human development (as well as chief health adviser) in 1997.

=== World Health Organization (1999–2005) ===
Nabarro joined the WHO in January 1999, as project manager of Roll Back Malaria, then moved to the Office of the Director General as executive director in March 2000. In this capacity, he worked with the director general Gro Harlem Brundtland for two years on a variety of issues, including the Commission on Macroeconomics and Health, Health Systems Assessments and the creation of the Global Fund to Fight AIDS, Tuberculosis and Malaria. As part of this work, he became for 1999-2001 a member of the board of directors of Medicines for Malaria Venture.

Nabarro transferred to the Sustainable Development and Healthy Environments cluster in 2003 and was appointed representative of the DG for health action in crises in July 2003.

Nabarro was stationed in the Canal Hotel in Baghdad, Iraq, when it was bombed on the afternoon of 19 August 2003. The blast targeted the UN, which had used the hotel as its headquarters in Iraq since 1991.

He also coordinated support for health aspects of crisis response operations in Darfur, Sudan, and in countries affected by the 2004 Indian Ocean earthquake and Tsunami.

=== UN System senior coordinator (2005–2014) ===
In September 2005, Nabarro was seconded from WHO and appointed senior UN system coordinator for avian and human influenza by secretary-general of the UN Kofi Annan to ensure that the UN system made an effective and coordinated contribution to the global effort to control the epidemic of avian influenza (also known as 'bird flu').

=== Coordinator of Global Food Security (HLTF) (2008–2014) ===
In January 2009, Nabarro took on the responsibility of coordinating the UN system's High-Level Task Force on Global Food Security (HLTF). The HLTF brought together 23 different organizations, funds, programs and other entities from within the UN family, as well as the Bretton Woods Institutions, the World Trade Organization (WTO), and the Organisation for Economic Co-operation and Development (OECD), and tasked them with establishing a common strategy for addressing food and nutrition insecurity in a more sustainable, coordinated and comprehensive way. Nabarro left the HLTF coordinator position in 2014 and was succeeded by Giuseppe Fantozzi.

=== Special representative of the UN Secretary-General (2009–2017) ===
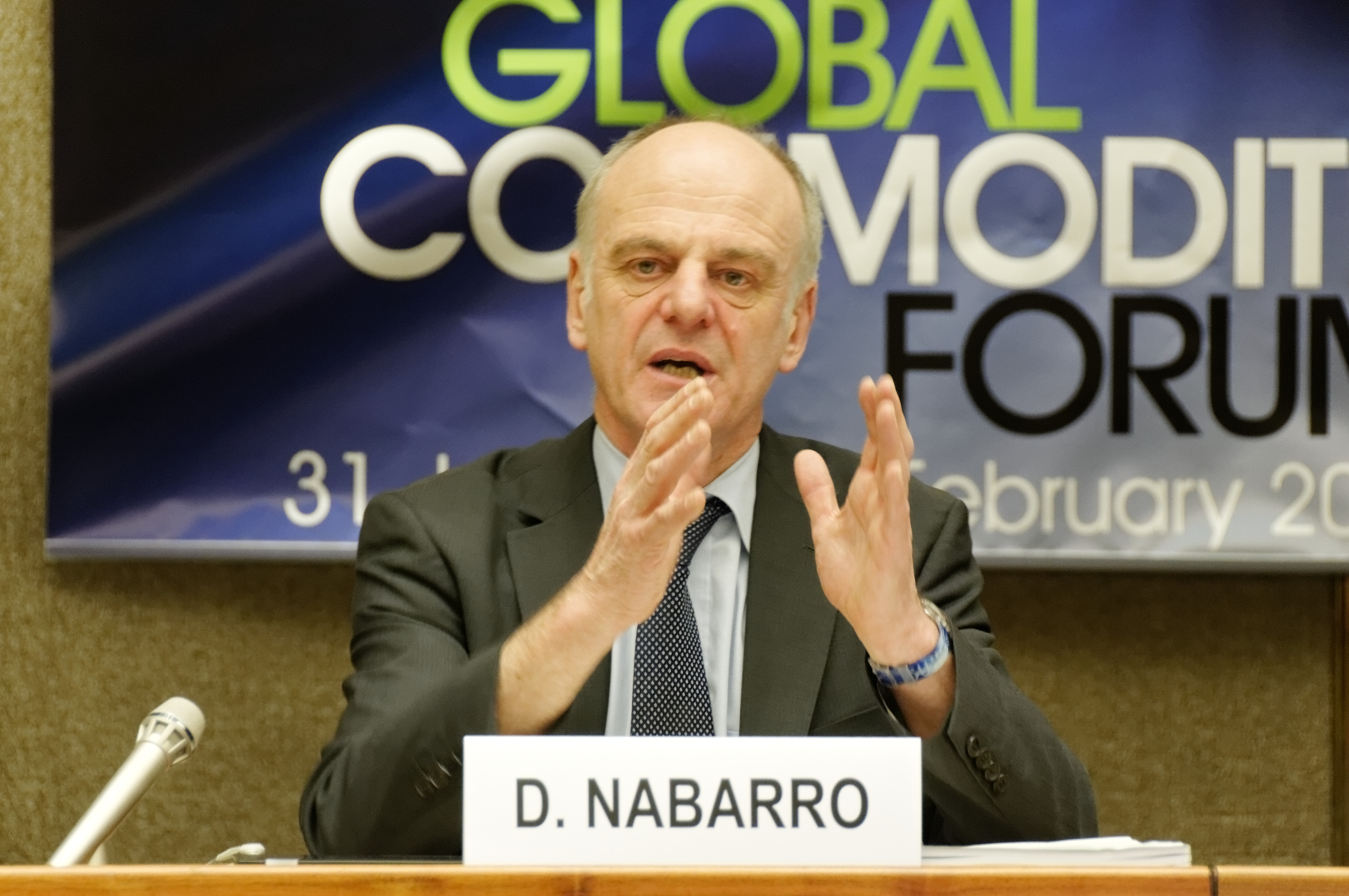
Nabarro addresses global food security crisis at Global Commodities Forum, United Nations Conference on Trade and Development

In November 2009 UN Secretary-General Ban Ki-moon appointed Nabarro as special representative on food security and nutrition. As special representative, Nabarro's role was to:

- Align UN system action on people's food security, livelihood resilience and sustainable agriculture in the face of changing climates
- Support functioning of the Committee on World Food Security
- Oversee UN Secretary-General's Zero Hunger Challenge

=== Coordinator of nutrition movement (2010–2015) ===
In September 2010, Nabarro was appointed coordinator of the Scaling Up Nutrition (SUN) Movement. SUN brings together government officials, civil society, the UN, donors, businesses and researchers in a collective effort to improve nutrition.

Betimes, he became Member of the WHO Commission on Ending Childhood Obesity (2016), 2013–2014.

=== Special envoy on Ebola (2014–2015) ===
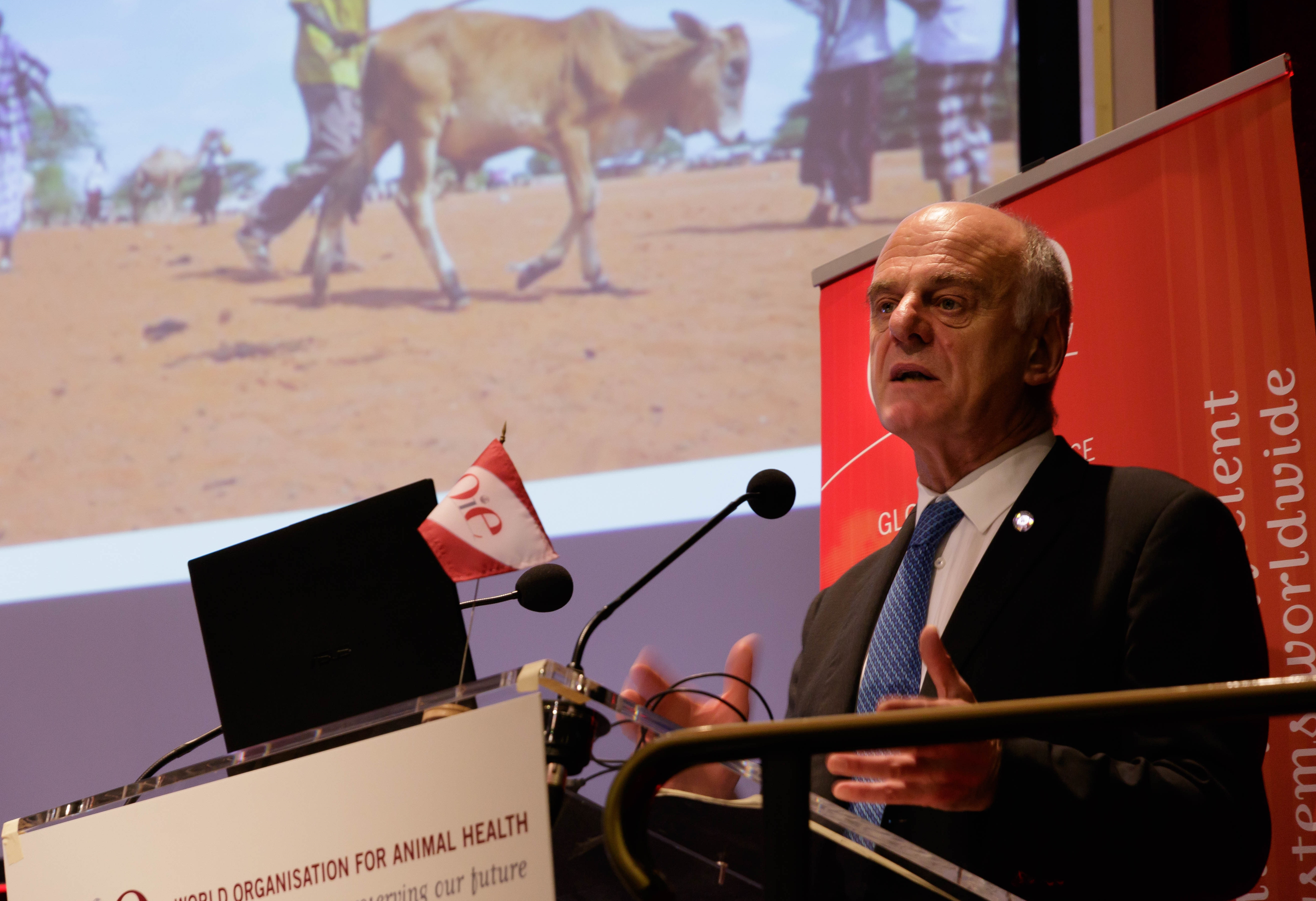
David Nabarro speaks at World Organisation for Animal Health

In August 2014, Nabarro was designated as special envoy of the UN Secretary-General on Ebola, with the responsibility for ensuring that the UN system makes an effective and coordinated contribution to the global effort to control the outbreak of Ebola. The epidemic is believed to have begun in December 2013 with the death of a 2-year-old boy in a remote area of Guinea, but was not recognized until March 2014. For several months the epidemic was spreading. This is something that public health experts in the affected locations, such as Médecins Sans Frontières (Doctors Without Borders), claimed was due to a deeply flawed and delayed response by health and government officials.

In an interview later in 2015, once Ebola had largely been brought under control, Nabarro said that when he started working on Ebola in 2014, he "was aware that we were in the middle of a disease outbreak of enormous proportions. The number of people getting sick was doubling every week. Facilities were completely overloaded. Communities were in a state of despair." He added that the international community had learned important lessons from the epidemic: "The world is going to be different as a result of this Ebola outbreak, much more confident, much more assured, and much, much more capable to ensure the well-being of its citizens."

=== Chair of the Advisory Group on Reform at WHO (2015–2016) ===
Nabarro was responsible for leading a high-level advisory group to guide reform of WHO's response to outbreaks and emergencies, prepare reports based on the group's recommendations and advise on the manner of their implementation.

=== Head of UN's response to cholera in Haiti (2016–2017) ===
In 2016 Nabarro was tapped to lead the UN's response to Haiti's cholera epidemic. Cholera had killed more than 10,000 Haitians in the six years since the disease was introduced by UN peacekeepers in 2010. After UN Secretary General Ban Ki-Moon issued a long overdue apology for the UN's "role" in the epidemic, Nabarro oversaw efforts to raise $400 million from UN member states to fund the Secretary General's proposed "New Approach" to cholera in Haiti. Nabarro was the second UN appointee to work on the cholera crisis in Haiti. Pedro Modrano Rojas previously served as a senior coordinator for the cholera effort, but left at the end of an 18-month term, stating that he was disappointed by the international community's "failure to acknowledge the fact that we have in Haiti the largest epidemic in the western hemisphere." Nabarro's efforts were no more successful—as a result of a lack of support from the UN Secretary General and from member states, Nabarro was only able to raise $2.7 million of the promised $400 million before being replaced by Josette Sheeran—though Sheeran would face the same obstacles as Nabarro.

=== Special adviser on Sustainable Development and Climate Change (2016–2017) ===
In January 2016, Nabarro was appointed special adviser on the 2030 Agenda for Sustainable Development by then UN Secretary-General Ban Ki-moon.

One of Nabarro's responsibilities in this role were to lead the UN's response to the cholera epidemic its peacekeepers sparked in Haiti in October 2010 when untreated, infected sewage from a UN base was deposited in the country's main river system. As of August 2016, at least 10,000 people had died and more than 800,000 have been sickened in the epidemic.

=== Candidate for WHO Director-General (2016–2017) ===
In September 2016, Nabarro was nominated by the UK's First May ministry to stand for the post of director-general (DG) of the World Health Organization (WHO). An article co-authored by the UK's chief medical officer, Sally Davies, was published in The Lancet. It outlined the criteria that the next DG of the WHO must fulfill.

Nabarro was one of six candidates put forward by their individual governments to succeed Margaret Chan. Nabarro outlined his four priorities as follows:

1. Alignment with the Sustainable Development Goals
2. Transforming the WHO to respond to outbreaks and health emergencies
3. Trusted engagement with Member States
4. Advancing people-centred health policies.

On 23 May, at the 70th World Health Assembly, Nabarro came second in the race to become the next director general, receiving 50 votes to Dr Tedros Adhanom's 133 in the third and final round of voting.

=== 4SD Foundation (2018–2025) ===
In 2018, David Nabarro and Florence Lasbennes established the 4SD Foundation in Geneva. The Foundation is focused on skills, systems, and synergies for sustainable development, and accompanies leaders as they navigate their way through complex sustainability challenges.

=== Imperial College London Professor ===
In 2018, Nabarro was appointed Professor at the Institute of Global Health Innovation at Imperial College London and then appointed in 2019 as Co-Director with surgeon Ara Darzi, Baron Darzi of Denham.

=== COVID-19 pandemic ===
On 21 February 2020, Nabarro was appointed as one of six Special Envoys from the DGWHO, who were tasked to respond to the COVID-19 pandemic. In October 2020, Nabarro gave an interview with The Spectator on YouTube in which he highlighted the WHO's updated position on lockdowns in regards to national responses to COVID. As a Special Envoy on COVID-19 for the World Health Organization, Nabarro said: "We in the World Health Organization do not advocate lockdowns as the primary means of control of this virus ... the only time we believe a lockdown is justified is to buy you time to reorganize, regroup, rebalance your resources, protect your health workers who are exhausted, but by and large, we'd rather not do it."

Nabarro argued that lockdowns should be used as "circuit breakers" and as a reserve measure to control the virus rather than a primary measure. In an interview with BBC Radio 4, he cautioned against a full national lockdown, describing it as "a very extreme restriction on economic and social life" that temporarily "freezes the virus in place". He said: "You don't want to use those as your primary, and I stress that, primary, means of containment. Because in the end living with the virus as a constant threat means maintaining the capacity to find people with the disease and isolating them."

Nabarro‘s comments were taken by some as meaning that the WHO did not support lockdowns. Rather, he emphasises that they do not support lockdowns as a primary measure for tackling the virus, and instead believe that having a robust test, trace and isolate system should be the priority for all governments, ensuring all those who are positive or who have been close to those infected are quarantined, with lockdown as "the reserve that you use to take the heat out of the system when things are really bad".

== Personal life and death ==
David Nabarro married firstly Gillian Holmes, from whom he was divorced, and subsequently remarried to Florence Lasbennes. He had two children by his first marriage, as well as two sons and a daughter by Dr Susanna Graham-Jones, sister of the actor and producer Sebastian Graham-Jones. He died suddenly at his residence in Ferney-Voltaire, France, on 25 July 2025, at the age of 75.

== Honours, recognition and awards ==
- World Food Prize 2018 (dubbed Nobel Prize for Agriculture): Awarded together with Lawrence Haddad for their individual and complementary global leadership in elevating maternal and child undernutrition to a central issue within the food security and development dialogue at national and international levels. They have been cutting the number of stunted children in the world by 10 million by lobbying governments and donors to improve nutrition.
- Helen Keller Humanitarian Award: Awarded for work on positioning malnutrition within the development dialogue and for ensuring an effective response to Ebola, 2015
- Sight and Life Nutrition Leadership Award (together with the Scaling Up Nutrition Movement): For work in catalysing sustainable change in global nutrition, 2012
- Distinguished Service Award from Health Policy Institute, Kansas University of Medicine & Biosciences: For outstanding Health Policy Leadership, 2008

Nabarro was appointed Commander of the Order of the British Empire (CBE) in 1992 for services to international public health and Knight Commander of the Order of St Michael and St George (KCMG) in the 2023 New Year Honours for services to global health.
