= Clinic =

Outpatient health care facility

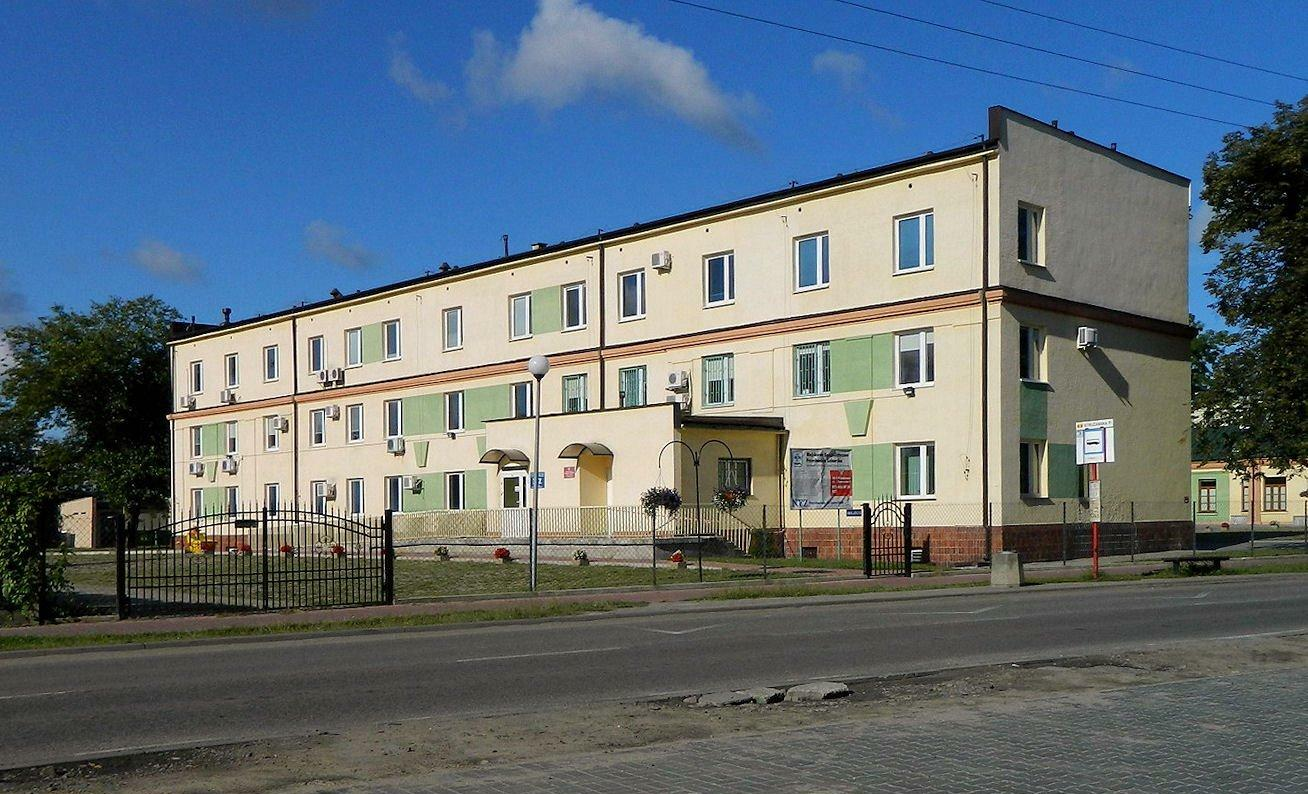
Military Policlinic in Legionowo, Poland

A clinic (or outpatient clinic or ambulatory care clinic) is a health facility that is primarily focused on the care of outpatients. Clinics can be privately operated or publicly managed and funded. They typically cover the primary care needs of populations in local communities, in contrast to larger hospitals which offer more specialized treatments and admit inpatients for overnight stays.

Most commonly, the English word clinic refers to a general practice, run by one or more general practitioners offering small therapeutic treatments, but it can also mean a specialist clinic. Some clinics retain the name "clinic" even while growing into institutions as large as major hospitals or becoming associated with a hospital or medical school.

== Etymology ==
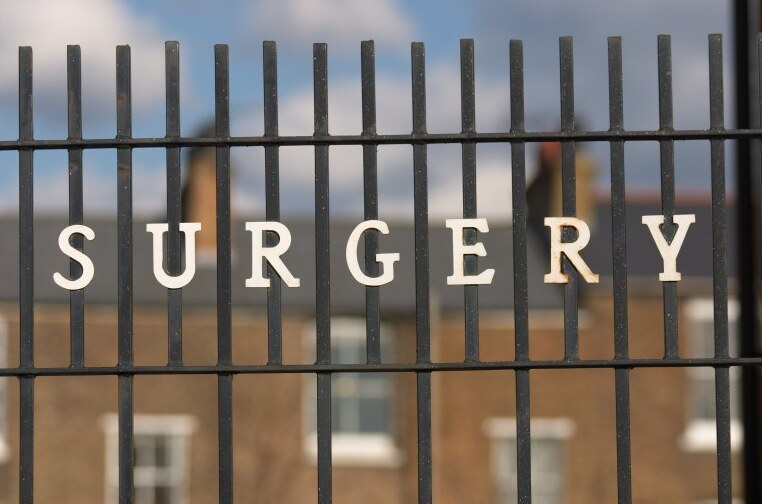
The entrance to a surgery clinic in Greenwich, London

The word clinic derives from Ancient Greek κλίνειν klinein meaning to slope, lean or recline. Hence κλίνη klinē is a couch or bed and κλινικός klinikos is a physician who visits his patients in their beds. In Latin, this became clīnicus.

An early use of the word clinic was "one who receives baptism on a sick bed".

== Overview ==
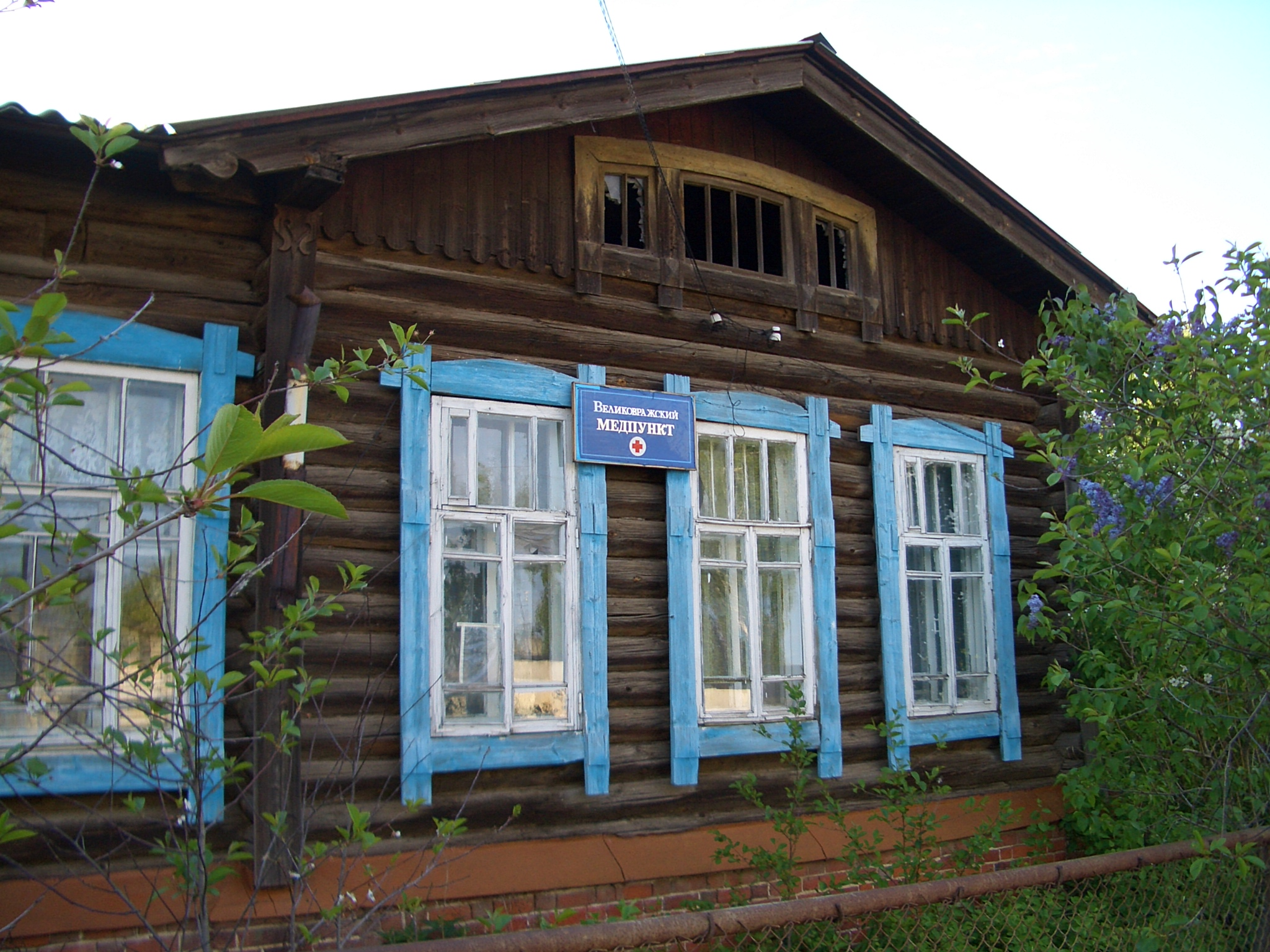
A medpunkt (health care access point) delivers primary health care to the residents of the village of Veliki Vrag, Russia.

Clinics are often associated with a general medical practice run by one or several general practitioners. Other types of clinics are run by the type of specialist associated with that type: physical therapy clinics by physiotherapists and psychology clinics by clinical psychologists, and so on for each health profession. This can even hold true for certain services outside the medical field: for example, legal clinics are run by lawyers.

Some clinics are operated in-house by employers, government organizations, or hospitals, and some clinical services are outsourced to private corporations which specialize in providing health services. In China, for example, owners of such clinics do not have formal medical education. There were 659,596 village clinics in China in 2011.

Health care in India, China, Russia and Africa is provided to those regions' vast rural areas by mobile health clinics or roadside dispensaries, some of which integrate traditional medicine. In India these traditional clinics provide ayurvedic medicine and unani herbal medical practice. In each of these countries, traditional medicine tends to be a hereditary practice.

== Function ==
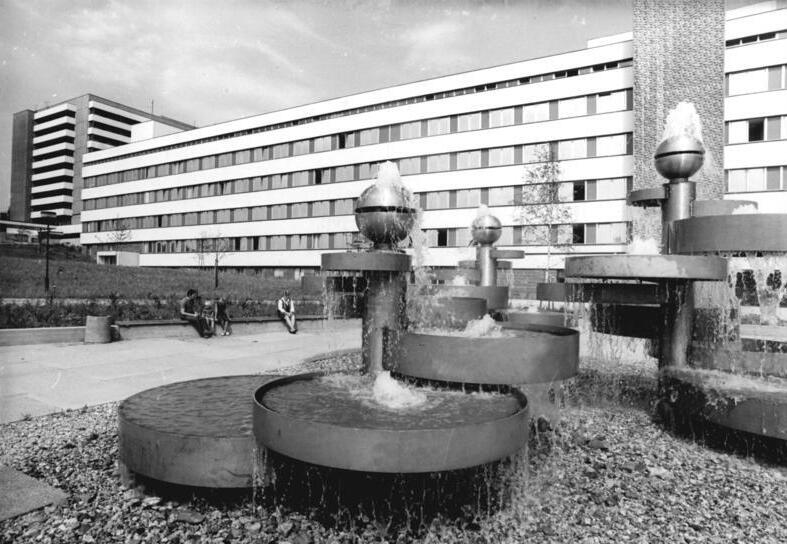
Policlinic in Karl-Marx-Stadt, German Democratic Republic

The function of clinics differs from country to country. For instance, a local general practice run by a single general practitioner provides primary health care and is usually run as a for-profit business by the owner, whereas a government-run specialist clinic may provide subsidized or specialized health care.

Some clinics serve as a place for people with injuries or illnesses to be seen by a triage nurse or other health worker. In these clinics, the injury or illness may not be serious enough to require a visit to an emergency room (ER), but the person can be transferred to one if needed.

Treatment at these clinics is often less expensive than it would be at a casualty department. Also, unlike an ER these clinics are often not open on a 24/7/365 basis. They sometimes have access to diagnostic equipment such as X-ray machines, especially if the clinic is part of a larger facility. Doctors at such clinics can often refer patients to specialists if the need arises.

== Large outpatient clinics ==
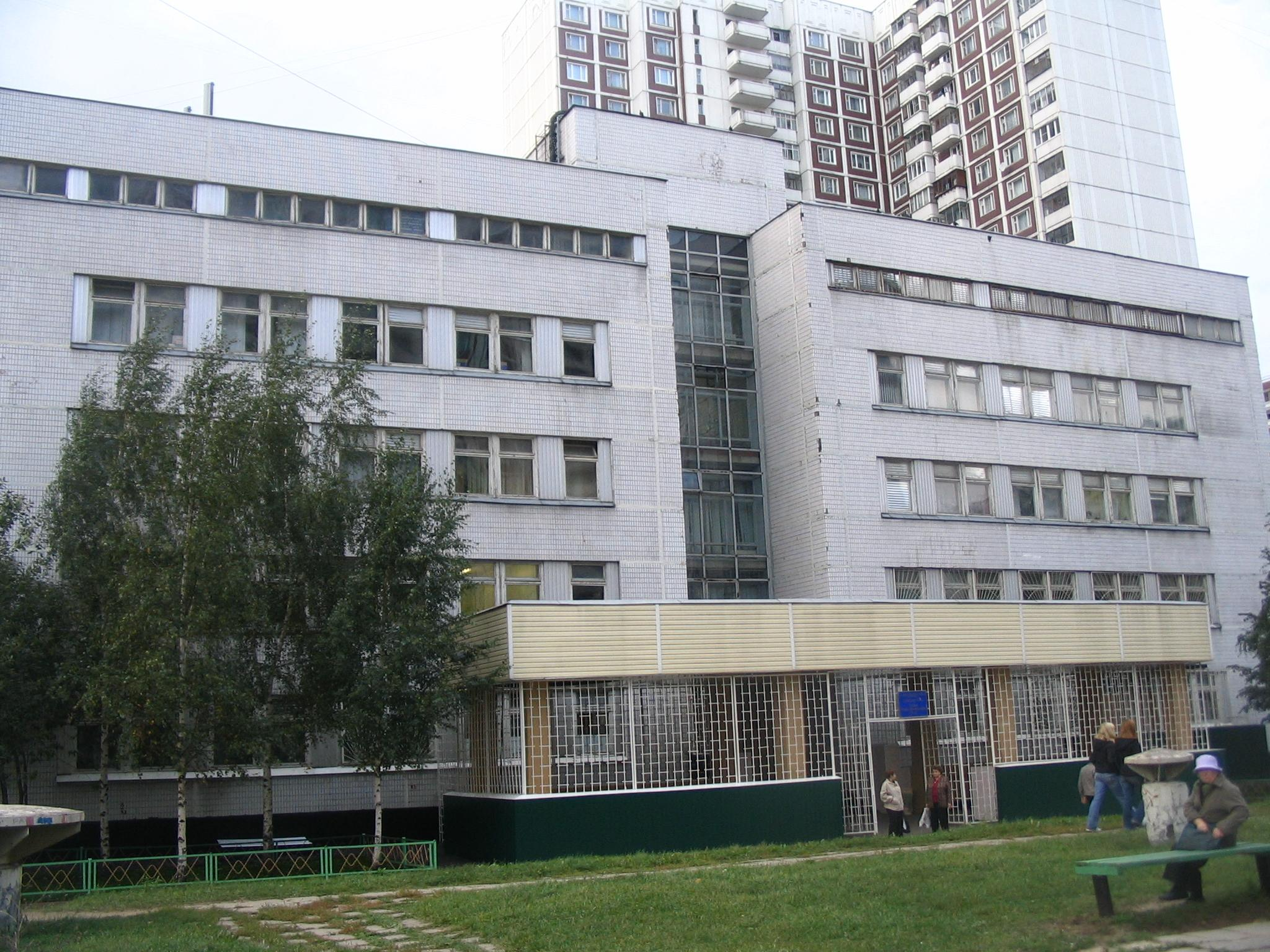
Children Policlinic in Novokosino District of Moscow

Large outpatient clinics vary in size, but can be as large as hospitals.

=== Function ===
Typical large outpatient clinics house general medical practitioners (GPs) such as doctors and nurses to provide ambulatory care and some acute care services but lack the major surgical and pre- and post-operative care facilities commonly associated with hospitals.

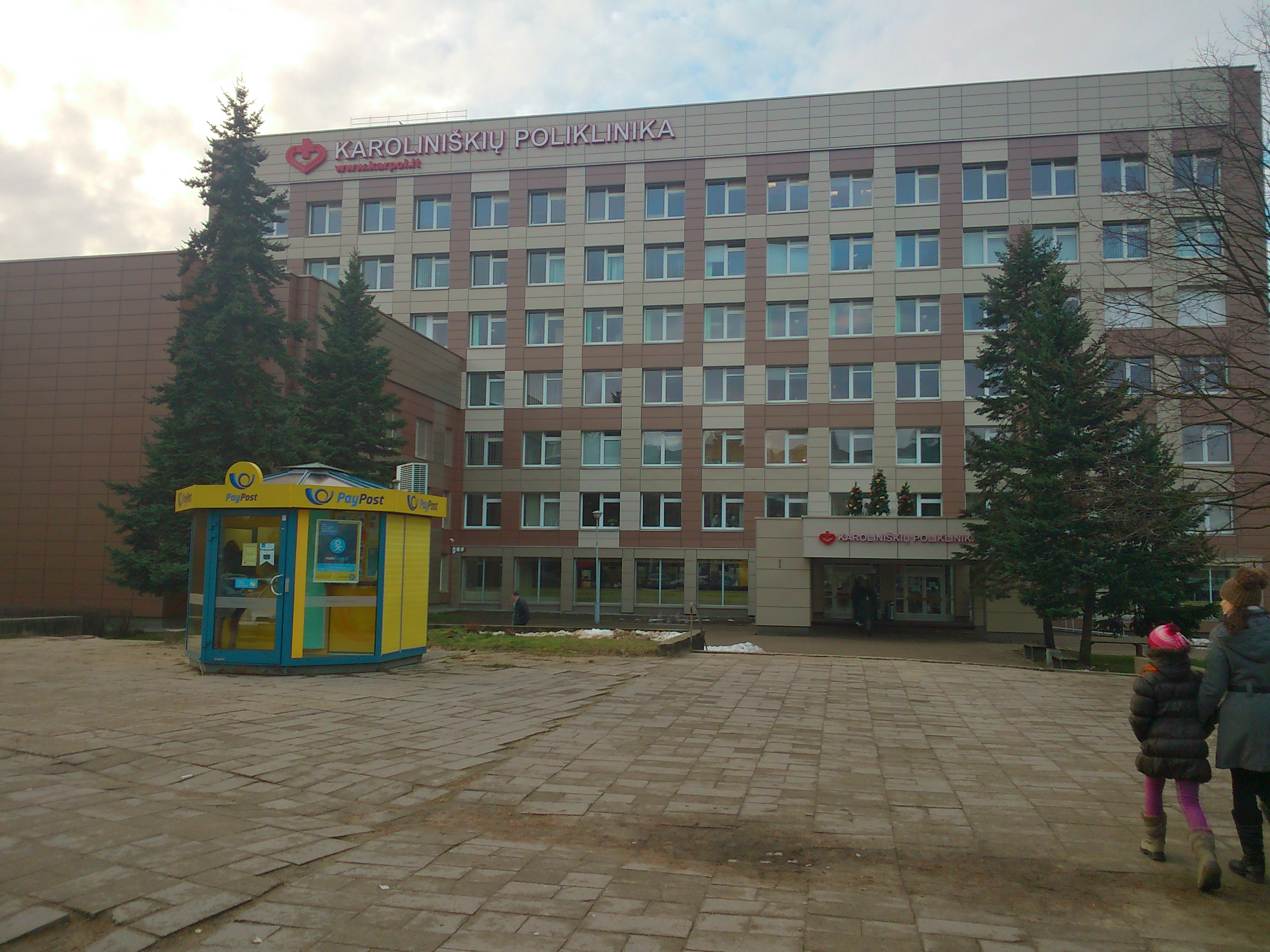
Policlinic in Vilnius-Karoliniškės, Lithuania

Besides GPs, if a clinic is a polyclinic, it can house outpatient departments of some medical specialties, such as gynecology, dermatology, ophthalmology, otolaryngology, neurology, pulmonology, cardiology, and endocrinology. In some university cities, polyclinics contain outpatient departments for the entire teaching hospital in one building.

=== Internationally ===
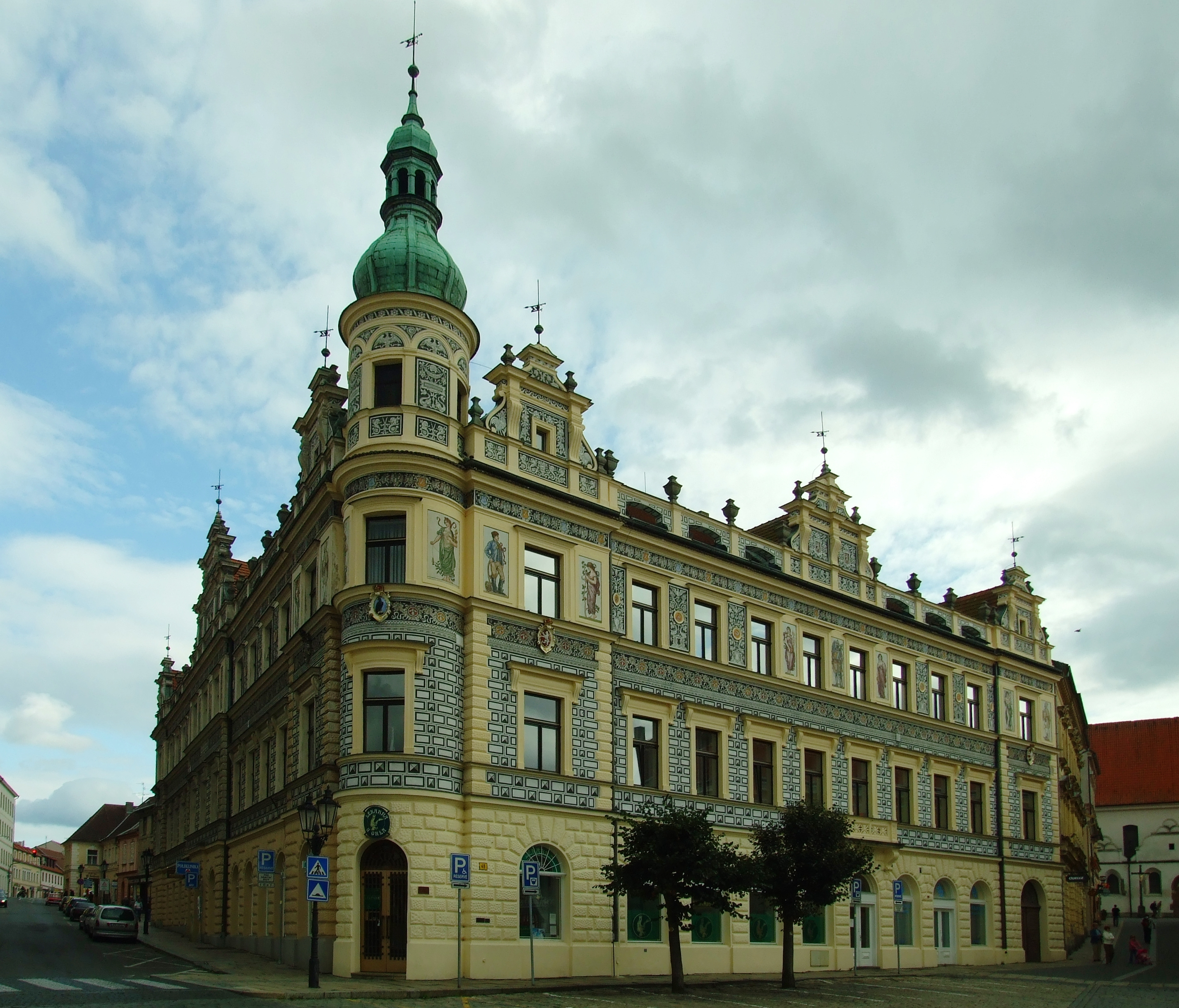
Policlinic in Písek, Czech Republic

Large outpatient clinics are a common type of healthcare facility in many countries, including France, Germany (long tradition), Switzerland, and most of the countries of Central and Eastern Europe (often using a mixed Soviet-German model), as well as in former Soviet republics such as Russia and Ukraine; and in many countries across Asia and Africa.

In Europe, especially in the Central and Eastern Europe, bigger outpatient health centers, commonly in cities and towns, are called policlinics (derived from the word polis, not from poly-).

Recent Russian governments have attempted to replace the policlinic model introduced during Soviet times with a more western model. However, this has failed.

In the Czech Republic, many policlinics were privatized or leasehold and decentralized in the post-communist era: some of them are just lessors and coordinators of a healthcare provided by private doctor's offices in the policlinic building.

India has also set up huge numbers of polyclinics for former defense personnel. The network envisages 426 polyclinics in 343 districts of the country which will benefit about 33 lakh (3.3 million) ex-servicemen residing in remote and far-flung areas.

Policlinics are also the backbone of Cuba's primary care system and have been credited with a role in improving that nation's health indicators.

=== Mobile clinics ===
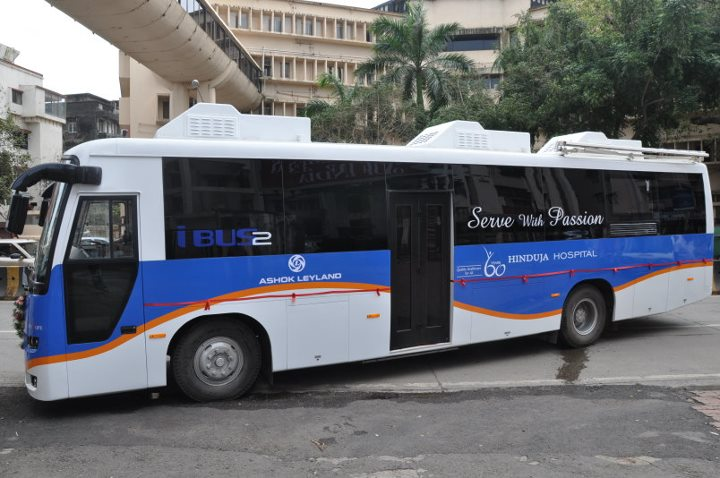
Hinduja National Hospital's mobile clinic

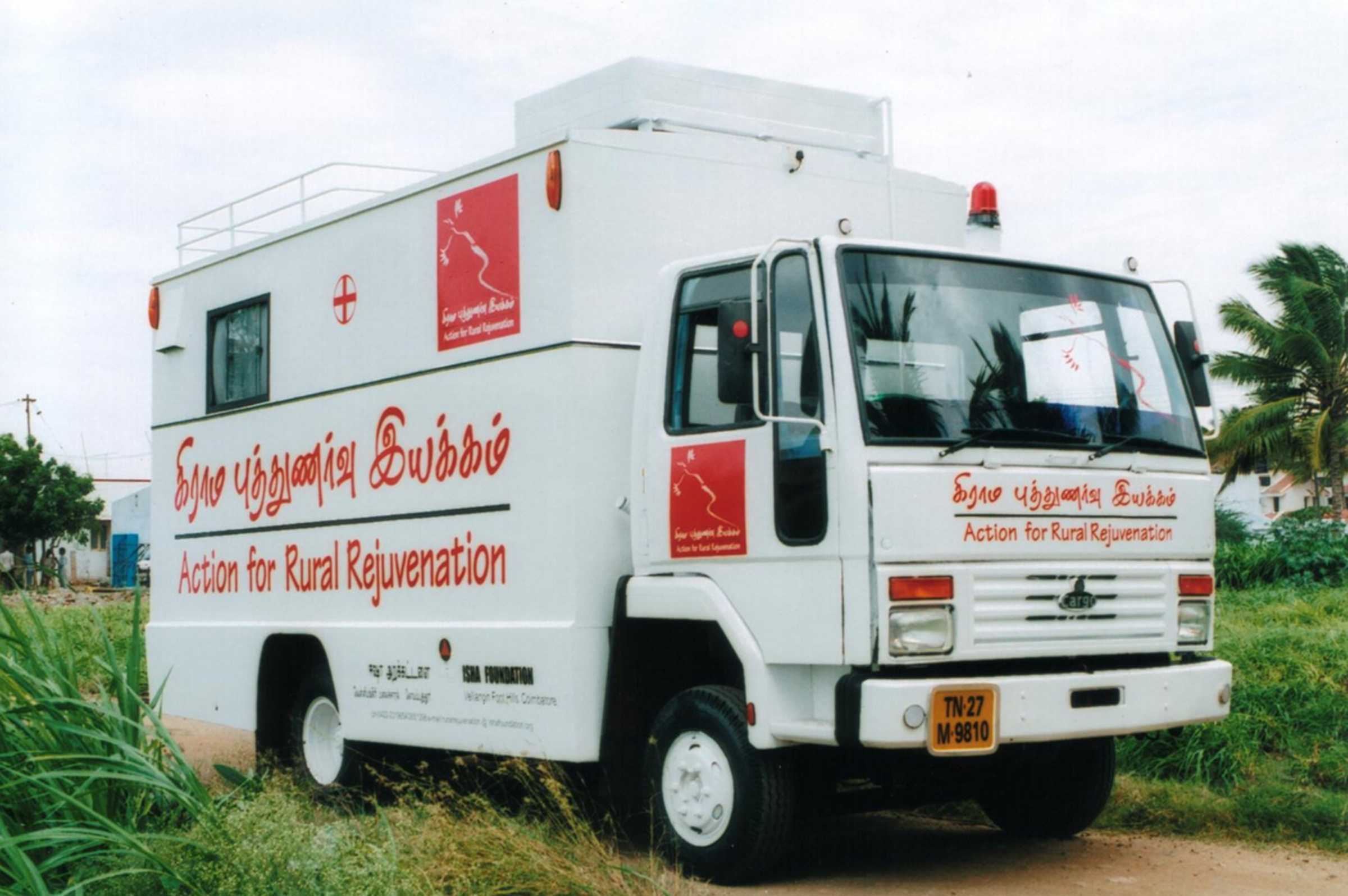
A mobile health clinic operated from a truck

Providing health services through mobile clinics provides accessible healthcare services to these remote areas that have yet to make their way in the politicized space. For example, mobile clinics have proved helpful in dealing with new settlement patterns in Costa Rica. Before foreign aid organizations or the state government became involved in healthcare, Costa Rica's people managed their own health maintenance and protection. People relied on various socio-cultural adaptations and remedies to prevent illnesses, such as personal hygiene and settlement patterns. When new settlements that sprang up along the coast became "artificial" communities, and due to lack of traditional home healing practices here, alternative methods such as mobile clinics had to be implemented in these communities for the protection and prevention of diseases.

A study done in rural Namibia revealed the health changes of orphans, vulnerable children and non-vulnerable children (OVC) visiting a mobile clinic where health facilities are far from the remote villages. Over 6 months, information on immunization status, diagnosis of anemia, skin and intestinal disorders, nutrition, dental disorders was collected and showed that visits to mobile clinics improved the overall health of children that visited regularly. It concluded that specified "planning of these programs in areas with similarly identified barriers may help correct the health disparities among Namibian OVC and could be a first step in improving child morbidity and mortality in difficult-to-reach rural areas."

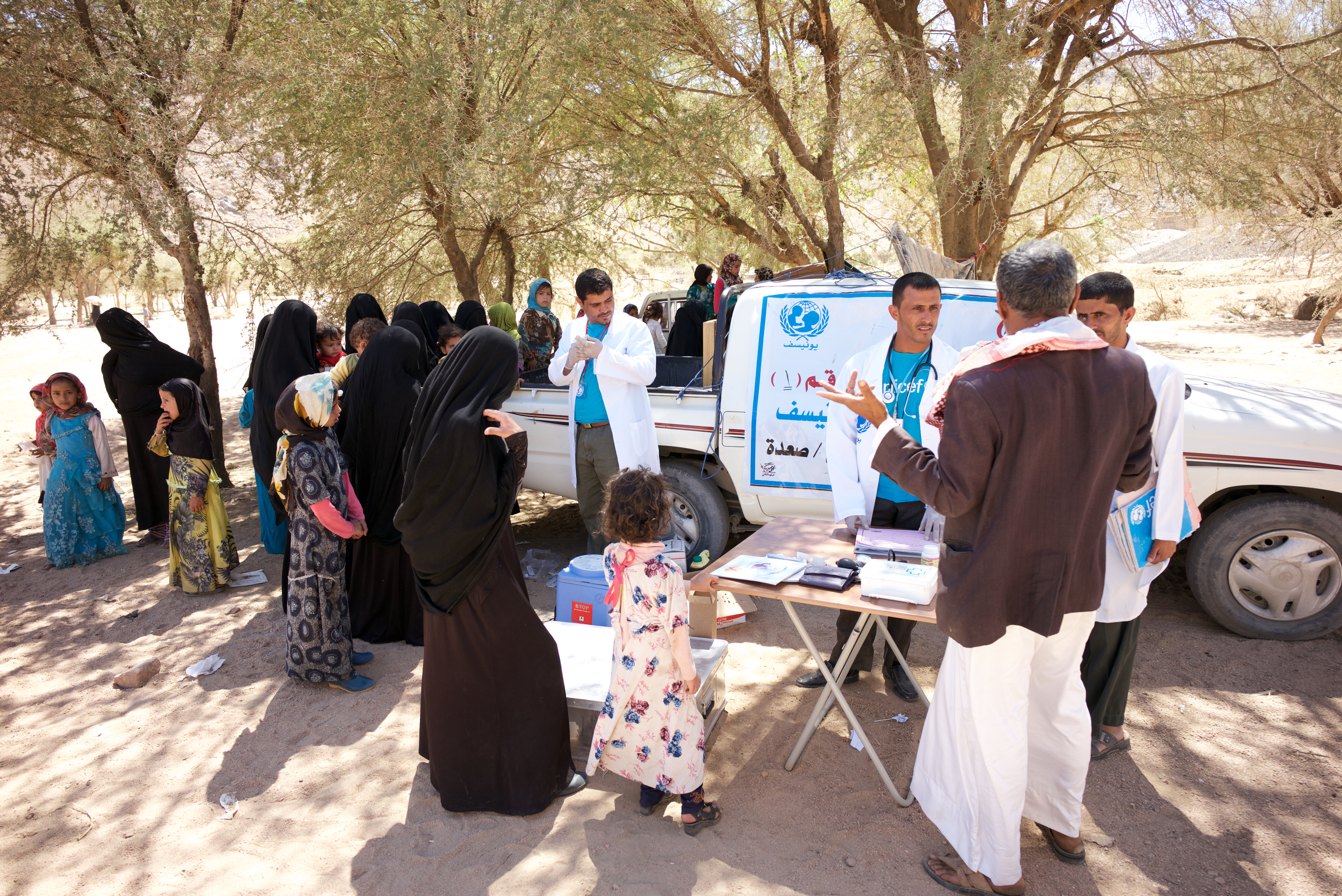
A mobile clinic run from a pickup truck in Yemen

Food supplementation in the context of routine mobile clinic visits also shows to have improved the nutritional status of children, and it needs further exploration as a way to reduce childhood malnutrition in resource-scarce areas. A cross-sectional study focussed on comparing acute and chronic undernutrition rates prior to and after a food-supplementation program as an adjunct to routine health care for children of migrant workers residing in rural communities in the Dominican Republic. Rates of chronic undernutrition decreased from 33% to 18% after the initiation of the food-supplementation program and shows that the community members attending the mobile clinics are not just passively receiving the information but are incorporating it and helping keep their children nourished.

== Types ==
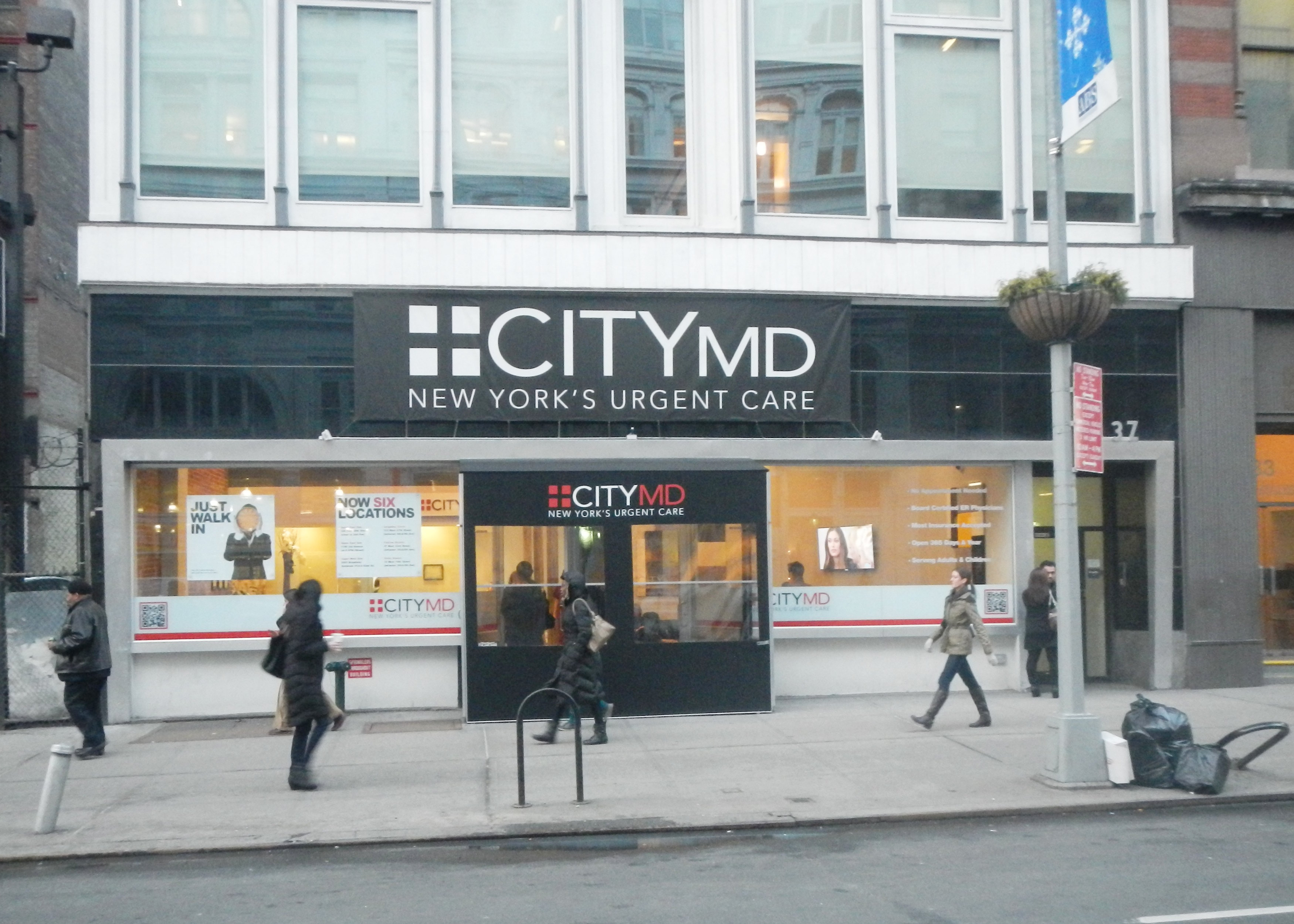
Storefront clinic in Manhattan

There are many different types of clinics providing outpatient services. Such clinics may be public (government-funded) or private medical practices.

- A CLSC are in Quebec; they are a type of free clinic funded by the provincial government; they provide service not covered by Canada's healthcare plan including social workers
- In the United States, a free clinic provides free or low-cost healthcare for those with little or without insurance.
- A retail-based clinic is housed in supermarkets and similar retail outlets providing walk-in health care, which may be staffed by nurse practitioners.
- A general out-patient clinic offers general diagnoses or treatments without an overnight stay.
- A polyclinic or policlinic provides a range of healthcare services (including diagnostics) without need of an overnight stay
- A specialist clinic provides advanced diagnostic or treatment services for specific diseases or parts of the body. This type contrasts with general out-patient clinics.
  - A sexual health clinic deals with sexual health related problems, such as prevention and treatment of sexually transmitted infections.
  - A gender identity clinic provides services relating to transgender health care.
  - A fertility clinic aims to help women and couples to become pregnant.
  - An abortion clinic is a medical facility providing abortion services to women.
  - An ambulatory surgery clinic offers outpatient or same day surgery services, usually for surgical procedures less complicated than those requiring hospitalization.
  - An ultrasound clinic offers medical ultrasound investigations for patients. An ultrasound clinic is normally run privately.

== See also ==
- Healthcare provider
- Health center
- Health systems management
- Healthcare system
- Nurse-led clinic
- Polyclinics in England
- Walk-in clinic
