= Community health center =

Clinic providing health services in a local area

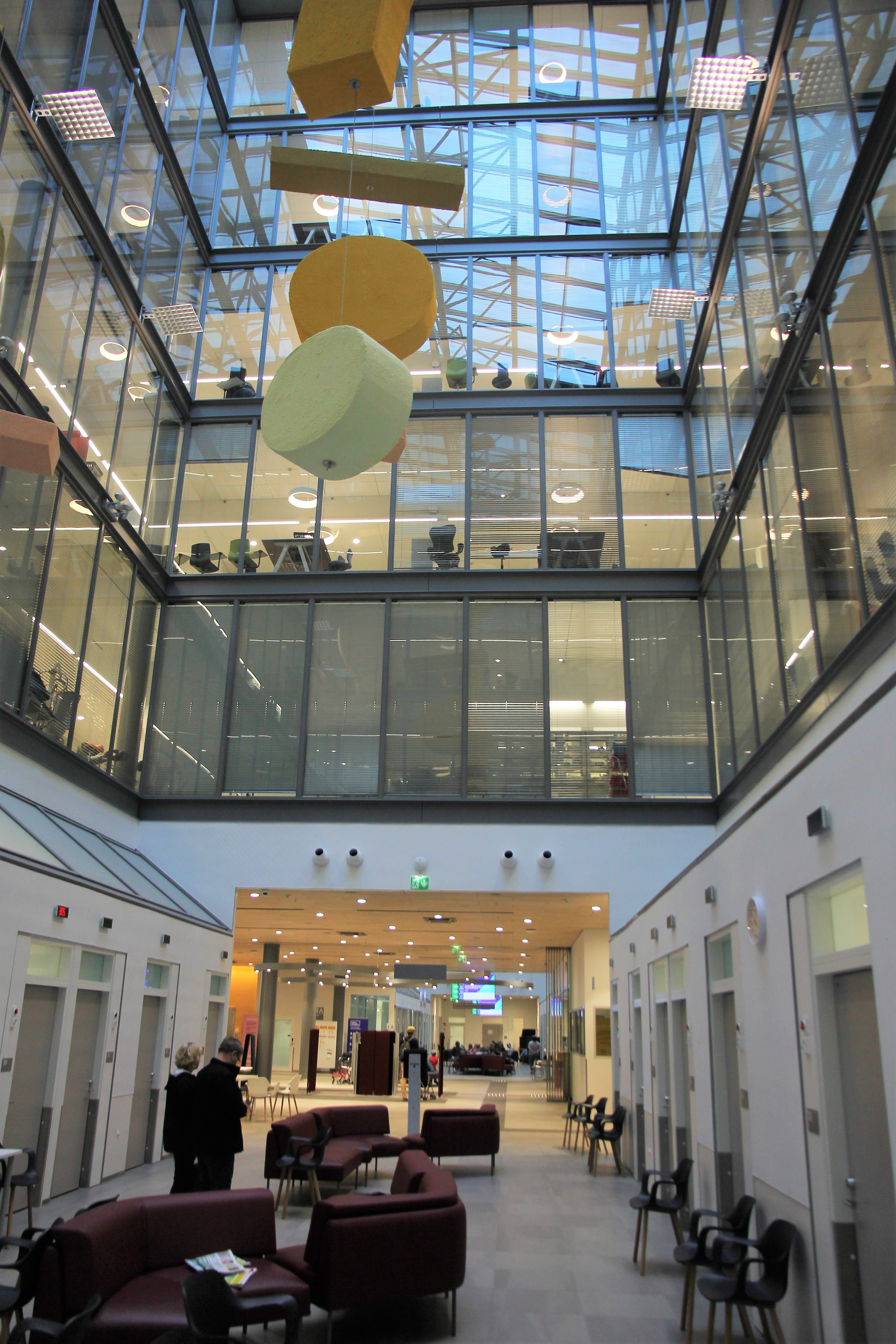
An interior of the health center in Kalasatama, Helsinki, Finland

A community health center, healthcare center or health center is one of a network of clinics staffed by a group of general practitioners and nurses providing healthcare services to people in a certain area. Typical services covered are family practice and dental care, but some clinics have expanded greatly and can include internal medicine, pediatric, women's care, family planning, pharmacy, optometry, laboratory testing, and more. In countries with universal healthcare, most people use the healthcare centers. In countries without universal healthcare, the clients include the uninsured, underinsured, low-income or those living in areas where little access to primary health care is available. In Central and Eastern Europe, bigger health centers are commonly called policlinics (not to be confused with polyclinics).

== Community health centers by country ==
=== Canada ===
Community Health Centers (CHCs) have existed in Ontario for more than 40 years. The first established CHC in Canada was Mount Carmel Clinic in 1926. Most CHC's consist of an interdisciplinary team of health care providers using electronic health records.

In Quebec, local community services centers known by their French acronym, CLSC, offer routine health and social services, including consultations with general practitioners with and without an appointment.

=== China ===
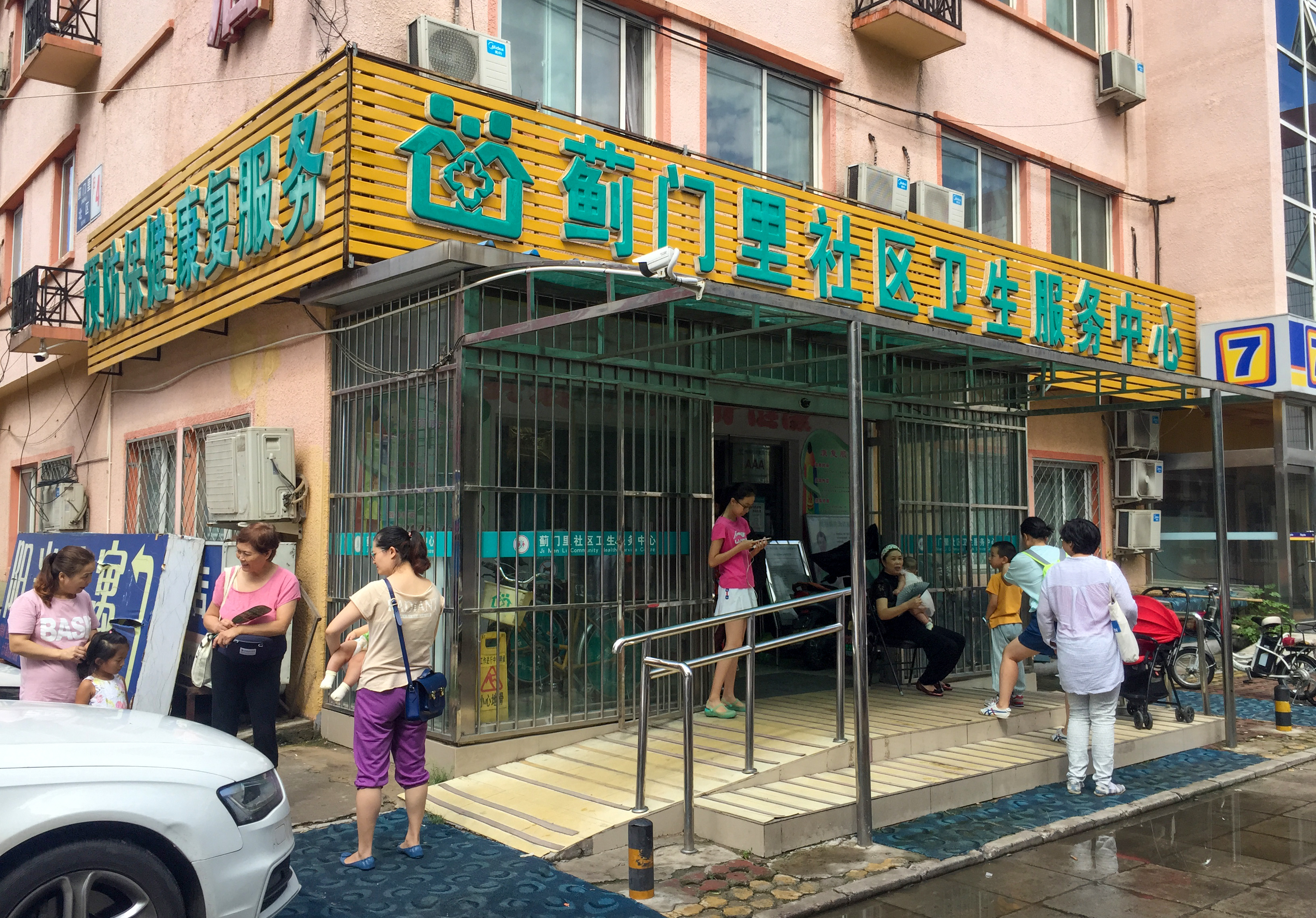
Jimenli community health service center in Haidian District, Beijing in 2017

In China there are, as of 2011, 32,812 community health centers and 37,374 township health centers.

=== Greece ===
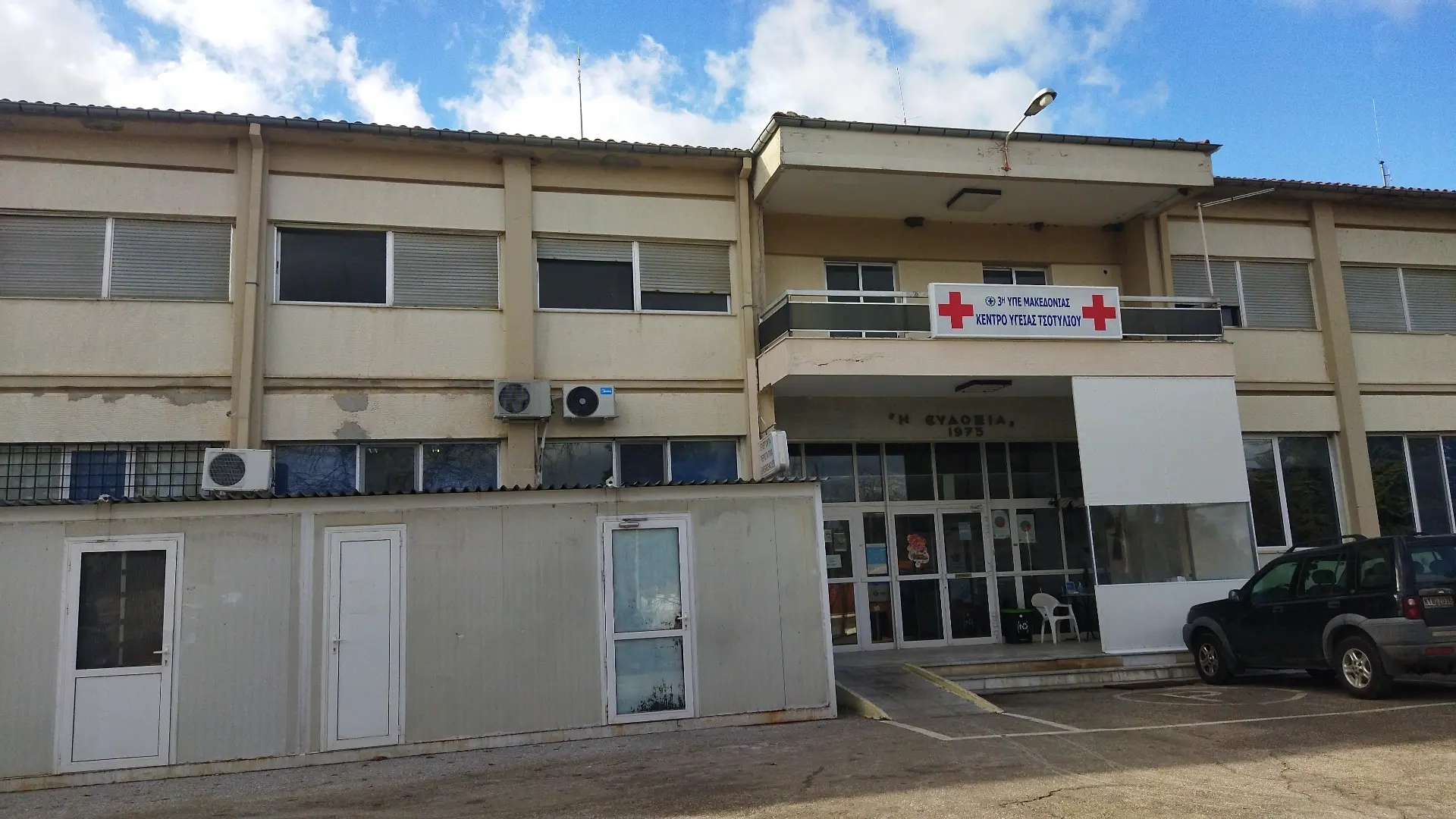
The first healthcare centre in Greece, Tsotyli

Health Centers are a part of the Primary Health Care of the National Healthcare System. They were created by the founding law of the NHS (1397/1983) by the first government of Andreas Papandreou. Today there are operated 322 Health Centers and 239 Local Health Units for the purpose of prevention, treatment and the rehabilitation of the patients.

=== Indonesia ===
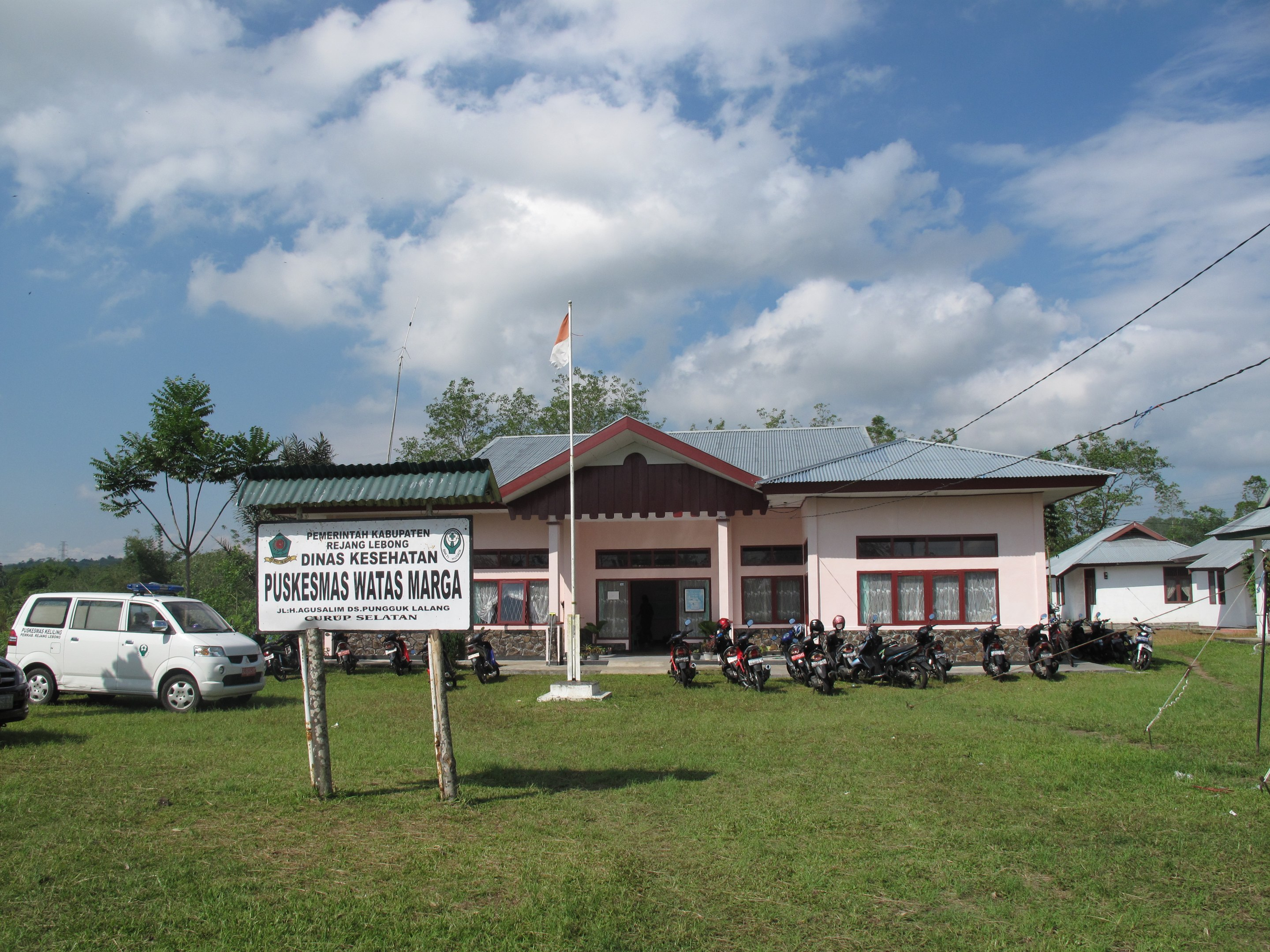
Puskesmas Watas Warga Curup Selatan, Rejang Lebong, Bengkulu, Indonesia.

Puskesmas (Indonesian: Pusat Kesehatan Masyarakat, lit. 'Community Health Center') are government-mandated community health clinics located across Indonesia. They are overseen by the Indonesian Ministry of Health and provide healthcare for the population on sub-district level. The concept was designed by Johannes Leimena, the third Indonesian Minister of Health, and be realized by G. A. Siwabessy in New Order era. Community and preventive health programs formed another component of Indonesia's health system. There is approximately 9718 Puskesmas around the country according to the Ministry of Health of Indonesia.

=== Portugal ===
The health center (Portuguese: centro de saúde) was the basic community primary healthcare unit of the National Health Service of Portugal, as well as acting as the local public health authority. Usually, each health center covered the area of one of the Portuguese municipalities, but municipalities with over 15 000 habitants could be covered by more than one of these centers. Health centers were staffed with general practitioners, public health physicians, nurses, social workers and administrative personnel.

In 2008, the more than 300 health centers were aggregated into around 70 health center groups (agrupamentos de centros de saúde) or ACES. Each ACES includes several family and personalized healthcare units, these being now the basic primary health care providers of the Portuguese National Health Service. Besides family health care services, the ACES also include public health, community health and other specialized units, as well as basic medical emergency services.

Some of the ACES were grouped with hospital units into experimental local health units (unidades locais de saúde) or ULS. The ULS are intended to increase the coordination between the primary and the secondary healthcare, through both of these services being provided by the same health unit.

=== United Kingdom ===
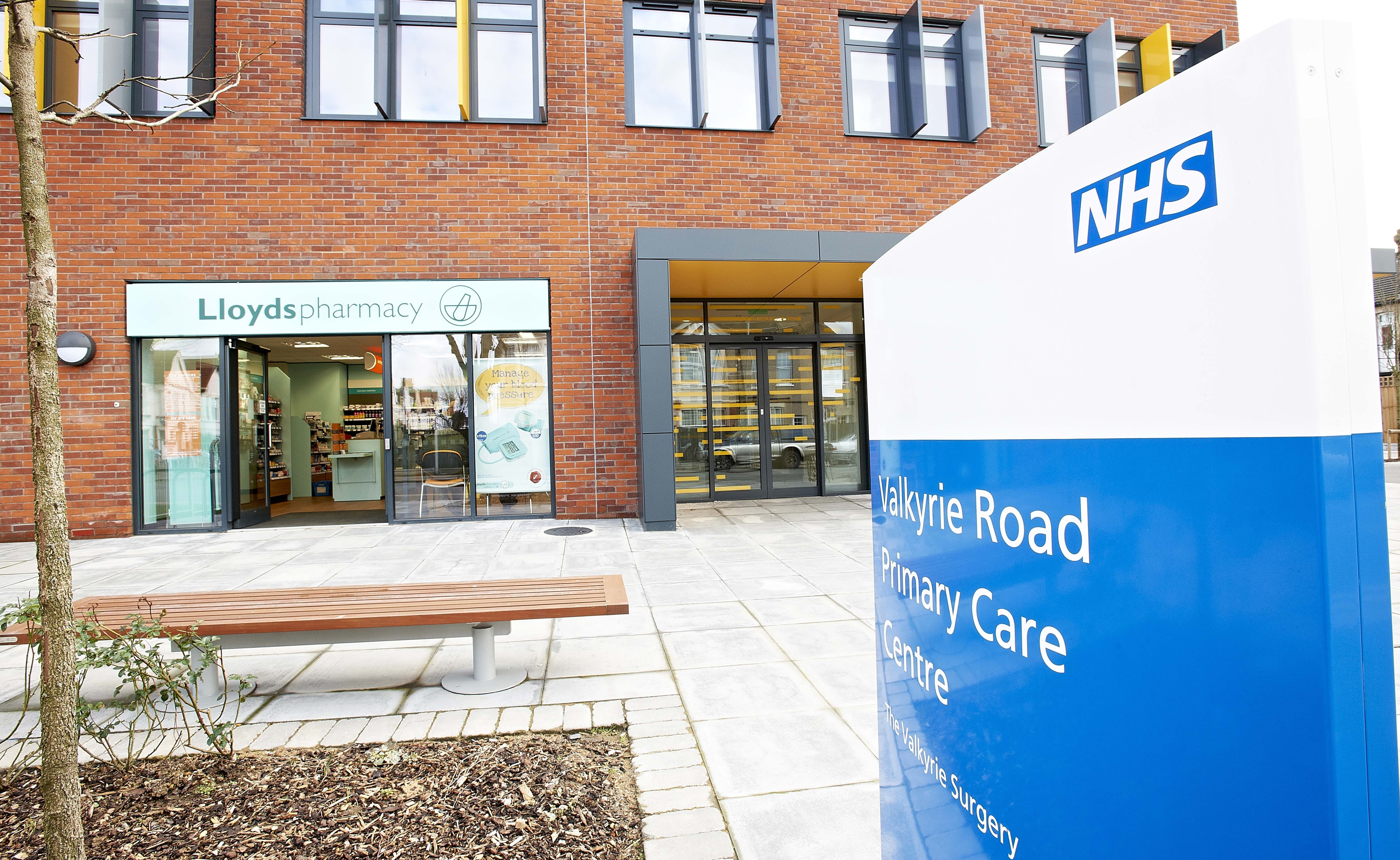
An NHS health center in the United Kingdom (Murphy Philipps Architects)

Bertrand Dawson was commissioned by Christopher Addison to produce a report on "schemes requisite for the systematised provision of such forms of medical and allied services as should... be available for the inhabitants of a given area". The Interim Report on the Future Provision of Medical and Allied Services was produced in 1920, though no further report ever appeared. The report laid down detailed plans for a network of Primary and Secondary Health Centres, together with detailed architectural drawings of different sorts of centers. By 1939 the term health center was widely used to refer to new buildings housing local health authority services. The Dawson report was very influential in debates about the National Health Service when it was set up in 1948, but few centers were built because "it was not practicable for local authorities to establish health centers without the full compliance of general practitioners" – which was not forthcoming. Far more attention and resources were devoted to hospital services than to primary care. From 1948 to 1974 local authorities were responsible for the building of health centers.

A well known center was opened at Woodberry Down in October 1952. It had provision for 6 GPs, 2 dentists, a pharmacist and two nurses. It cost about £163,000, which included the cost of a day nursery and child guidance clinic. This was regarded as extravagant and used as an excuse by critics for not building more. Harlow, where 4 centers were built by the new town corporation, was the only community in Britain served exclusively by doctors working from health centers.

The few centers that were built "functioned as isolated islands in a sea of General Practitioners generally indifferent to their success". There were later calls to establish a network of centers to include not only GPs but also dentists and diagnostic facilities. In 1965 there were only 30 health centers in England and Wales, and 3 in Scotland. By 1974 there were 566 in England, 29 in Wales and 59 in Scotland. After the National Health Service Reorganisation Act 1973, responsibility for promoting health centers was transferred to Area Health Authorities and there were renewed calls to establish more Health Centres. It was suggested that these centers could arrange alternative medical care for patients "when their doctor is off duty, or for emergency calls when he is engaged elsewhere".

Lord Darzi set up a network of Polyclinics in England when he was a minister in 2008. These clinics had some features in common with earlier proposals for health centers, but shared with them considerable resistance from GPs.

See also Community diagnostic centre.

=== United States ===
A community health center is a not-for-profit, consumer directed healthcare organization that provides access to high quality, affordable, and comprehensive primary and preventive medical, dental, and mental health care. Community health centers have a unique mission of ensuring access for underserved, under-insured and uninsured patients.

In the U.S., Community Health Centers (CHCs) are neighborhood health centers generally serving Medically Underserved Areas (MUAs) which includes persons who are uninsured, underinsured, low-income or those living in areas where little access to primary health care is available. Largely federally and locally funded, some health clinics are modernized with new equipment and electronic medical records. In 2006, the National Association of Community Health Centers implemented a model for offering free, rapid HIV testing to all patients between the ages of 13 and 64 during routine primary medical and dental care visits.

Medically Underserved Areas/Populations are areas or populations designated by the Health Resources and Services Administration (HRSA) as having: too few primary care providers, high infant mortality, high poverty and/or high elderly population. Health Professional Shortage Areas (HPSAs) are designated by HRSA as having shortages of primary medical care, dental or mental health providers and may be geographic (a county or service area), demographic (low income population) or institutional (comprehensive health center, federally qualified health center or other public facility).

== See also ==
- Ambulatory care – Medical care provided for outpatients
- Community health – Field of public health
- Doctor's visit – Meeting between a patient and a physician
- Health administration – Field relating to administration of hospitals
- Health insurance – Insurance covering health-related expenses
- Health professional – Individual who provides medical treatments and health advice
- Low-threshold treatment programs
- Social work – Academic discipline and profession
