= Krasilnikov Mansion =

- Особняк Красильникова
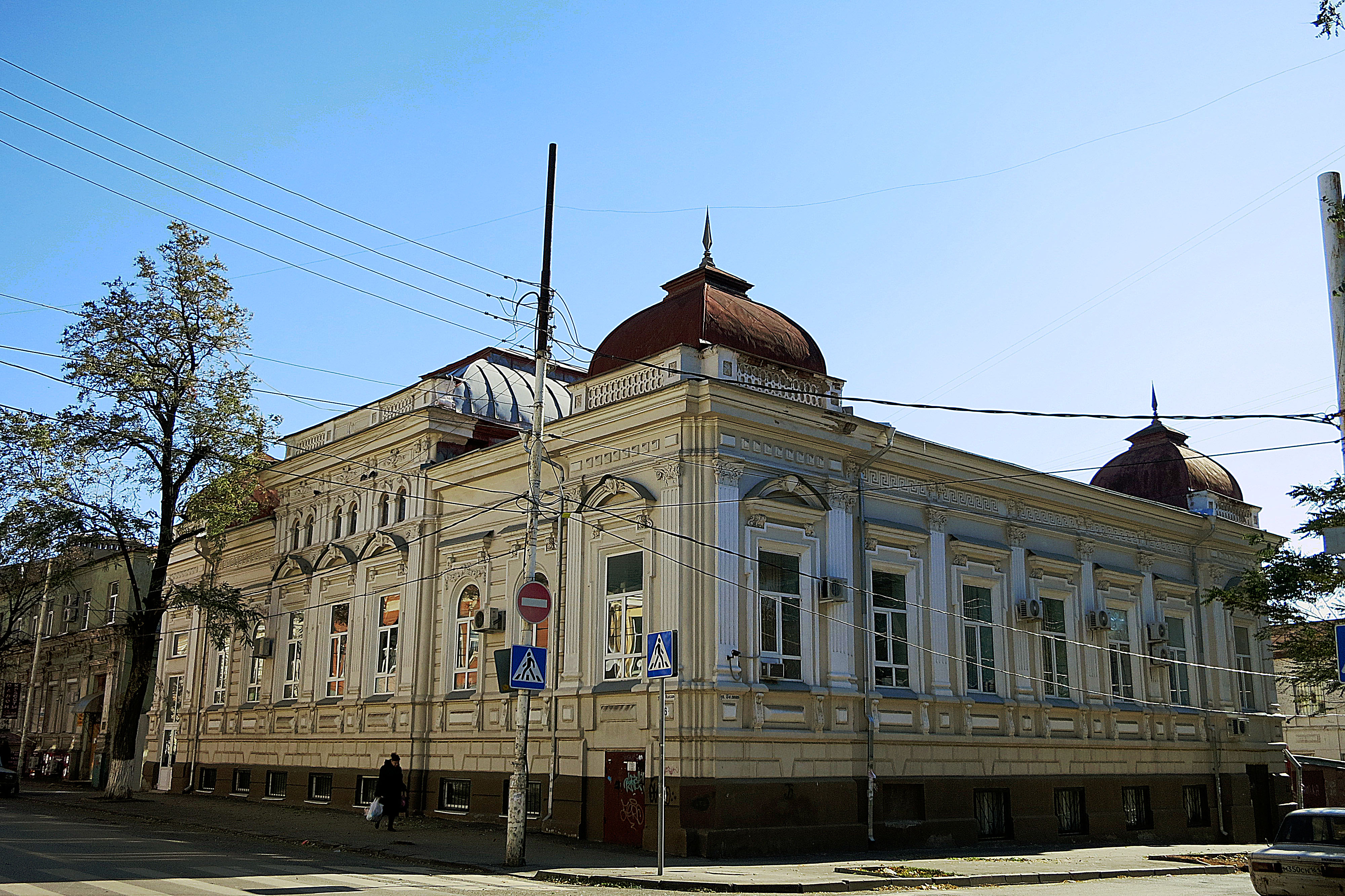
- Location: 6, 1st Mayskaya Street, Rostov-on-Don
- Coordinates: 47°13′54″N 39°45′37″E

The Krasilnikov Mansion (Russian: Особняк Красильникова) is a building in Rostov-on-Don dating from the last quarter of the 19th century. It was built in the eclectic style for the merchant Yegor Krasilnikov. The building is located at the intersection of 1st Mayskaya Street and the 18th Line. It currently houses an antenatal clinic. The Krasilnikov Mansion has the status of an object of cultural heritage of regional significance.

== History and description ==
The house on 1st Sofiyevskaya Street (nowadays 1st Mayskaya Street) was built to the order of the merchant Yegor Minayevich Krasilnikov. He lived in the mansion with his family, often hosting balls and receptions. The windows of the two-storey reception hall overlooked 1st Sofievskaya Street. Adjacent to it was a gallery with a balustrade, where musicians performed. Bedroom, nurseries, an office, and other rooms were located along the 18th Line frontage. In the cellar there were utility rooms: a kitchen, laundry, and servants' quarters. A stable, a coach house and an ice house were located in the courtyard.

In 1922, during Soviet rule, the building was nationalized. The "Drop of Milk", a special aid post for hungry and weakened children, was housed in the building. From 1927 there was an antenatal clinic in the building. From 1943 to 1954 a polyclinic, and from 1954 to 1976 a paediatric clinic operated in the former Krasilnikov mansion. Since 1976 the building has housed an antenatal clinic. There was a fire in the building on 29 March 2015.

The Krasilnikov Mansion was built in the eclectic style. The main facade of the one-storey building faces 1st Mayskaya Street. Its middle part is raised and completed with an attic. Quadrangular domes are installed in the corners. The building is richly decorated with stucco molding and plaster, with Baroque and Renaissance elements. Among the decorative elements are brackets, panels, friezes, garlands, female heads, Hermes masks, pilasters and archivolts. The building has the corridor system of planning with one- and two-sided arrangements of rooms.
