= Minister for Health (House of Lords) =

Parliamentary Under-Secretary of State for Innovation
- Royal Arms of Her Majesty's Government

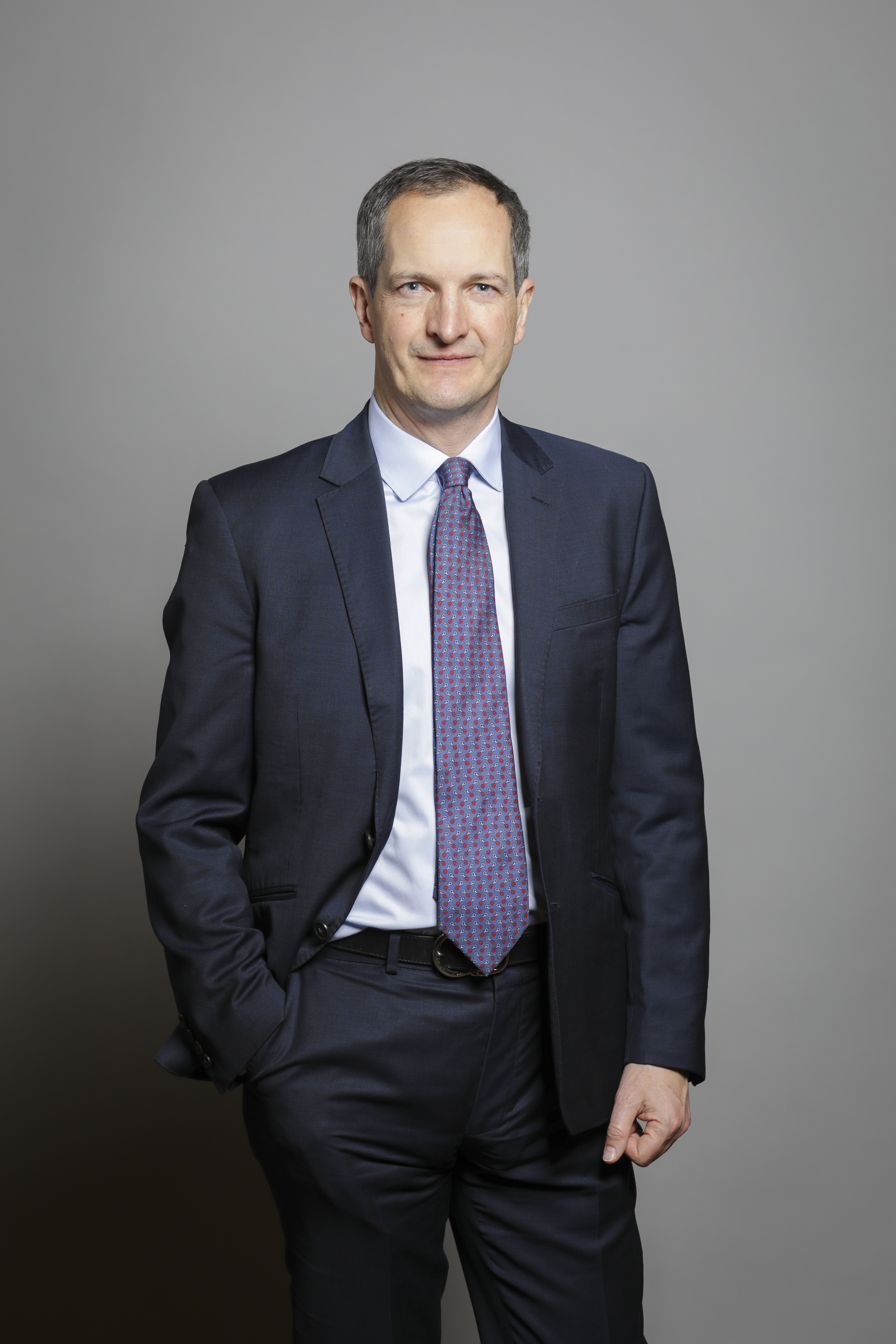
- Incumbent; The 5th Baron Bethell since 9 March 2020
- Department of Health and Social Care
- Style: Minister
- Nominator: Prime Minister of the United Kingdom
- Appointer: The Monarch; on advice of the Prime Minister
- Term length: At Her Majesty's pleasure
- Formation: 1989
- First holder: Gloria Hooper, Baroness Hooper
- Website: www.gov.uk/government/ministers/parliamentary-under-secretary-of-state--137

The Parliamentary Under-Secretary of State for Innovation is a junior position in the Department of Health and Social Care in the British government. It is currently held by The 5th Baron Bethell, MP, who took the office on 9 March 2020.

== Responsibilities ==
The minister is responsible for the following:

- COVID-19:
  - supply (medicines and testing)
  - treatments and vaccines
  - long-term health impacts
  - test and trace: testing, trace, technology
- life sciences
- medicines
- research
- health protection
- anti-microbial resistance
- global health security
- international diplomacy and relations
- data and technology
- rare diseases
- NHS security management, including cyber security
- blood and transplants and organ donation

== List of ministers ==
Name	Portrait	Entered office	Left office	Political party	Notes
The Baroness Hooper		28 July 1989	14 April 1992	Conservative	Parliamentary Under-Secretary of State for Health
The Baroness Cumberlege		14 April 1992	2 May 1997	Conservative	Parliamentary Under-Secretary of State for Health
The Baroness Jay of Paddington		2 May 1997	27 July 1998	Labour	Minister of State for Health
The Baroness Hayman		28 July 1998	29 July 1999	Labour	Parliamentary Under-Secretary of State for Health
The Lord Hunt of Kings Heath		1 January 1998	17 March 2003	Labour	Parliamentary Under-Secretary of State for Health
The Lord Warner		13 June 2003	4 January 2007	Labour	Minister of State for National Health Services Delivery
The Lord Hunt of Kings Heath		5 January 2007	28 June 2007	Labour	Minister of State for National Health Services Reform
The Lord Darzi of Denham		29 June 2007	21 July 2009	Labour	Parliamentary Under-Secretary of State for Health
The Baroness Thornton		19 February 2010	11 May 2010	Labour	Parliamentary Under-Secretary of State for Health
The Earl Howe		17 May 2010	11 May 2015	Conservative	Parliamentary Under-Secretary of State for Health
The Lord Prior of Brampton		14 May 2015	21 December 2016	Conservative	Parliamentary Under-Secretary of State for National Health Services Productivity
The Lord O'Shaughnessy		21 December 2016	31 December 2018	Conservative	Parliamentary Under-Secretary of State for Health
The Baroness Blackwood of North Oxford		10 January 2019	13 February 2020	Conservative	Parliamentary Under-Secretary of State for Life Science
The Lord Bethell		9 March 2020	Incumbent	Conservative	Parliamentary Under-Secretary of State for Innovation
