= Institute of Global Health Innovation =

Institute of Imperial College London

The Institute of Global Health Innovation is one of Imperial College London’s global challenge Institutes. Established in 2010, its mission is to improve global health and care through evidence-based innovation. The Institute’s work aims to support the identification, development and implementation of healthcare innovation, with the goal of sustainably reducing inequalities in global health.

The Institute is cross-disciplinary and works across a range of fields including data science, mathematics, health economics, medicine, policy, design and engineering. Its focus is on translational research. In addition to research and development, the Institute offers a number of educational and training programmes, and hosts regular events. It also works to influence health policy through evidence generation and dissemination.

== Research ==
The Institute works across a broad range of global healthcare issues, including COVID-19, mental health, patient safety, nutrition, digital health, end of life care, robotic surgery and cancer. Its activities span the entire research and development pipeline, from discovery to design, testing and dissemination of new products, practices and policies in healthcare.

Notable research activities include the REACT study, a major UK Government-funded programme of home coronavirus testing; and ongoing work with Google Health and others to develop an artificial intelligence system for breast cancer screening, which was found to outperform radiologists in early testing. Other major programmes of work include a collaboration with the UK DRI Care Research and Technology centre to develop technologies for a smart ‘healthy home’ environment for people with dementia, and the development and evaluation of the medical information app, Streams, which is currently being rolled out across several NHS Trusts.

Recently the Institute has launched collaborative programmes on emerging healthcare issues including medical data sharing, cyber security, and the impact of climate change on mental health.

== Centres of Excellence ==
The Institute of Global Health Innovation (IGHI) is structured around Centres of Excellence whose work spans medicine, policy, technology and design. The four core Centres of the Institute are:

- The National Institute for Health and Care Research (NIHR) Imperial Patient Safety Translational Research Centre
- The Centre for Health Policy
- The Hamlyn Centre
- Helix Centre

== Leadership ==
The Institute’s co-directors are Professor the Lord Ara Darzi of Denham, and Professor David Nabarro CBE.

== Global partnerships ==
The Institute is a partner of the World Innovation Summit for Health (WISH), an initiative of the Qatar foundation. WISH is a global community that aims to capture and disseminate evidence-based ideas and practices in global healthcare. Its biennial Summits launch a series of policy reports on a range of healthcare challenges, offering practical recommendations for leaders to address them. The Institute has co-written a number of WISH reports. These include recent reports on climate change and health, cybersecurity, and digital mental health technologies.

In partnership with WISH, IGHI hosts the Leading Health Systems Network, a collaborative network of healthcare leaders and organisations dedicated to improving health care delivery. In addition to holding regular knowledge-exchange events, the Network has released a number of evidence-based health policy reports including on antimicrobial resistance and maternity care.

The Institute’s NIHR Imperial Patient Safety Translational Research Centre was selected as the academic partner of the Global Patient Safety Collaborative, an alliance between the World Health Organization and the UK Government. The aim of the Collaborative is to secure and scale up global action on patient safety, reduce the risk of avoidable harm and improve the safety of health systems at the country level.

== Education ==
The Institute of Global Health Innovation offers several education programmes at Imperial. These include Master’s degrees in Patient Safety, Health Policy, Healthcare and Design, and Medical Robotics and Image-Guided Intervention. Notable alumni include Jacob Haddad, who was named one of Europe’s best innovators under 30 by Forbes.

In partnership with Imperial College Healthcare NHS Trust, the University of Edinburgh and HDR UK, IGHI is also leading the development and delivery of the NHS Digital Academy, a programme that trains healthcare professionals to drive digital transformation in the NHS.
