= Sight and Life =

Sight and Life is a think tank that focuses on eliminating malnutrition in children and women of childbearing age.

== History ==
Sight and Life was founded in 1986 by the Swiss global healthcare company, F. Hoffmann-La Roche, Ltd, and focused on providing assistance to address the problem of Vitamin A deficiency in developing countries. This assistance was provided mostly in the form of free Vitamin A capsules and Vitamin A supplementation projects. The organisation also provided grants and scholarships for healthcare professionals in developing countries to attend international conferences, workshops, and courses or academic programs. Other types of support included grants for small-scale projects and programmatic research. Sight and Life also began publishing the Sight and Life Newsletter, which disseminated news from the projects and research it supported as well as general news and specific features related to Vitamin A.

When DSM acquired Roche's Fine Chemicals division, Roche Vitamins, in 2003, the company continued the Sight and Life Initiative and Newsletter (which it repackaged as the Sight and Life Magazine), and broadened the Initiative's focus to address a wider range of micronutrient deficiencies, not just vitamin A deficiency. This broader focus is reflected in Sight and Life's current programming and grantmaking policies as well as the magazine's editorial content. Sight and Life is also active in promoting greater awareness of the problems of nutritional anemia (or iron deficiency anemia), and the "double burden of malnutrition", an emergent phenomenon in settings of nutritional transition in which both malnutrition and over-nutrition (e.g. obesity), and the diseases associated with them, are found in the same population.

== Cooperation partners ==
Since its founding, Sight and Life has supported over 3,200 research and project activities in over 80 countries between Africa, Asia Pacific and Latin America. These activities are conducted in collaboration with universities, UN agencies, and non-government and government organizations. Organizational partners include Johns Hopkins University, ETH Zürich (the Swiss Federal Research Institute), the North-West University (South Africa), the United Nations World Food Programme (WFP), World Health Organization (WHO), the United States Agency for International Development (USAID), the Micronutrient Forum, the Micronutrient Initiative, Groupe de Recherches et d'Echanges Technologiques (GRET), the Swiss Red Cross, and the Christian Blind Mission.

A current partnership with WFP focuses on improving and increasing nutritious food for people in poor countries and during humanitarian crises, toward which DSM and Sight and Life have provided WFP with technical expertise, nutritional products and financial assistance.
