= Ara Darzi, Baron Darzi of Denham =

Armenian-British surgeon (born 1960)

The Right Honourable The Lord Darzi of Denham OM KBE PC FRS FMedSci HonFREng
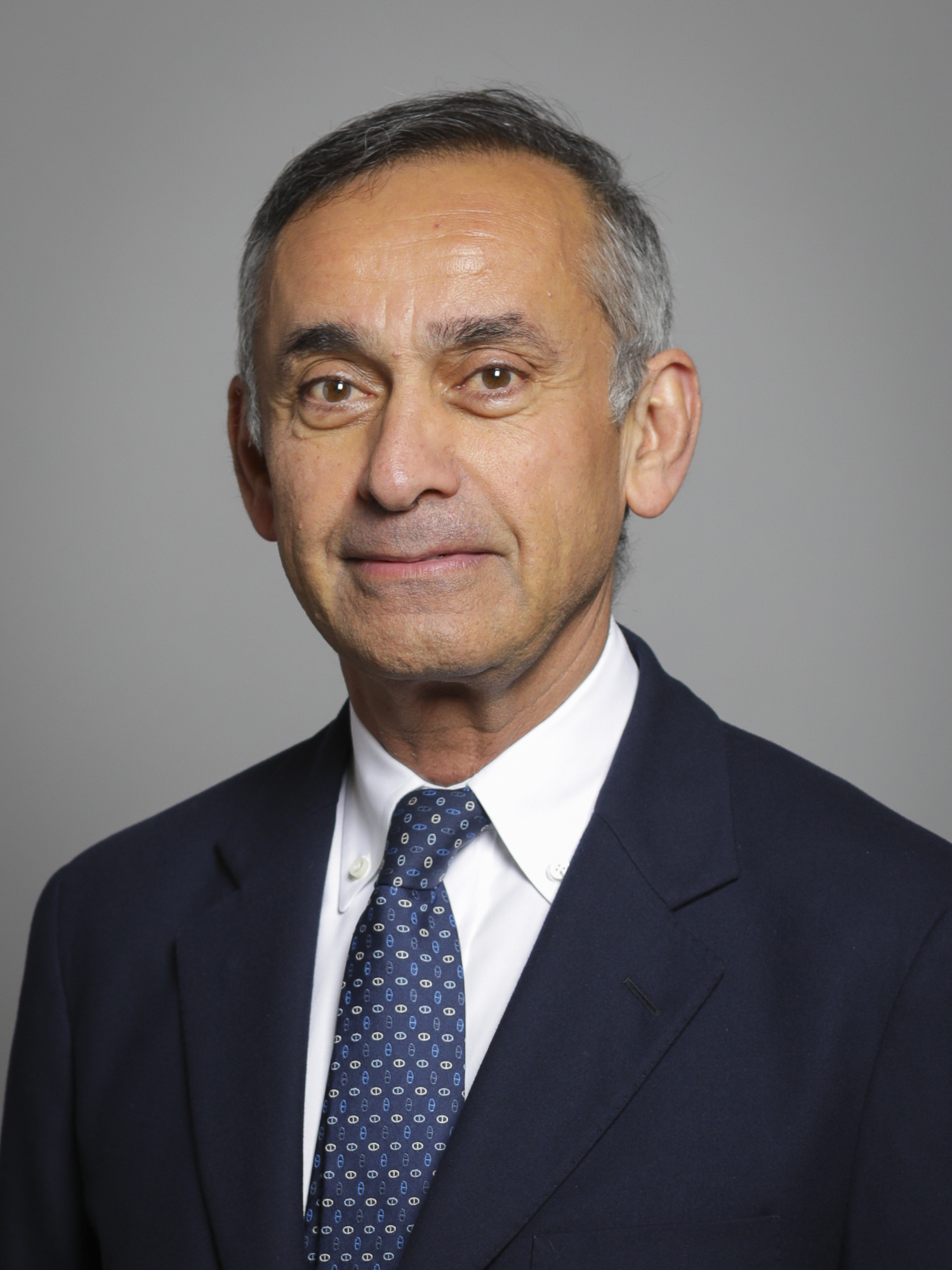
- Official portrait, 2019

Parliamentary Under-Secretary of State for Health
- In office 29 June 2007 – 21 July 2009
- Prime Minister: Gordon Brown
- Preceded by: The Lord Hunt of Kings Heath
- Succeeded by: The Baroness Thornton

Member of the House of Lords
- Lord Temporal
- Life peerage 12 July 2007

Personal details
- Born: Ara Warkes Darzi; 7 May 1960 (age 66) Baghdad, Iraq
- Party: None (non-affiliated)
- Other political affiliations: Labour (until 2019)
- Education: Royal College of Surgeons in Ireland; Trinity College Dublin
- Scientific career
- Known for: Darzi Centres; Pioneering keyhole surgery; National Health Service Reform & London Health Commission (2008)
- Awards: Sash of Independence, Qatar; Fellow of the Royal Society (2013); Fellow of the Institute of Medicine (2013); Knight Commander of the Order of the British Empire; Privy Counsellor; FMedSci (2003)
- Fields: Global health; Laparoscopic surgery
- Workplaces: Institute of Global Health Innovation; Imperial College London; Royal Marsden Hospital; Trinity College, Dublin; Institute of Cancer Research

Ara Warkes Darzi, Baron Darzi of Denham (Armenian: Արա Վարդգես Դարզի; born 7 May 1960) is an Armenian-British surgeon, academic, and politician.

Lord Darzi is an academic surgeon and holds the Paul Hamlyn Chair of Surgery at Imperial College London, specialising in the field of minimally invasive and robot-assisted surgery, having pioneered many new techniques and technologies. He is co-director of the Institute of Global Health Innovation and the NIHR Imperial Patient Safety Translational Research Centre at Imperial College London. He has tried to reform the National Health Service (NHS) in England and is recognised internationally as an advocate for applying innovative reforms to health systems globally.

Until resigning the whip in July 2019, Darzi sat as a Labour member of the House of Lords, but now sits as an independent peer because of his belief that Jeremy Corbyn failed to control antisemitism within Labour.

== Early life and family ==
Darzi was born in Baghdad, Iraq to Armenian parents displaced by the 1915 Armenian genocide. His family had lived in Erzurum, Ottoman Empire (now Turkey). His paternal great-grandparents, Tatyos and Elbiz Shiroian, had one daughter and four sons. Of them only Elbiz and her daughter, Arevalous (Darzi's grandmother), survived the genocide. They fled on foot to northern Iraq with the aid of a friend of Tatyos. Darzi's father was born in Mosul and his mother was born in Baghdad.

Darzi is fluent in Armenian and served as a choirboy for Armenian religious services, growing up in Baghdad . He was educated at Baghdad College, but the situation in Iraq in the late 1970s led to his family's emigration. At 17, he moved to Ireland to study medicine, while his parents and sister eventually settled in London. "We were refugees. We had thrived in Iraq. But it was quite clear that we had to move on again. The first Persian Gulf war was looming. I remember my father saying: 'The kids need to get out of here,'" Darzi recalled in 2015.

He studied medicine at the Royal College of Surgeons in Ireland, obtaining the degrees of LRCP&SI MB BCh BAO in 1984, and went on to gain the postgraduate degree of MD at Trinity College Dublin. He also gained a Fellowship of the Royal Colleges of Surgeons (being those of England, Ireland, Edinburgh, and Glasgow).

== Medical career ==
In 1990, Darzi moved from Ireland to Britain to further his career in surgery. In 1991, aged 31, he was appointed as a consultant surgeon at Central Middlesex Hospital and in 1994 moved to St Mary's Hospital, London and also joined Imperial College London, where he was appointed a Professor in 1996. He was promoted to Chair of Surgery and Head of Department in 1998. Darzi holds the Paul Hamlyn Chair of Surgery at Imperial College and the Institute of Cancer Research. He is also an honorary consultant surgeon at St Mary's Hospital and the Royal Marsden Hospital. He has held many senior administrative appointments within the Faculty of Medicine at Imperial College, Research Council, Editorial Board of Scientific Journals, and medical royal colleges.

He holds the fellowship of the American College of Surgeons and has been elected as a fellow of the Academy of Medical Sciences, an honorary fellow of the Royal Academy of Engineering and more recently a foreign associate of the Institute of Medicine. From 2005 to 2008, he was president of the Bath Institute of Medical Engineering (BIME).

Darzi's main clinical and academic interest is in minimally invasive surgery and allied technologies in which he and his team are internationally recognised. He leads a team of researchers covering a wide spectrum of engineering and basic sciences research topics including Medical Image Computing, Biomedical Engineering, Clinical Safety, surgical education and training at post-graduate and undergraduate levels and robotics. He has published more than 800 peer-reviewed papers and authored, co-authored or edited several books.

This work has received international recognition including the Queen's Anniversary Prize for Excellence in Higher and Further Education 2001, Hamdan Award for Medical Research Excellence in 2004. In 2006, Darzi and his department were awarded the Rector's Research Excellence Award for their work on surgical robots.

Darzi is an enthusiastic advocate of Patient record access arguing that interested patients and carers, especially those accustomed to self-management of their condition, should take the lead in creating apps and other means of accessing records that are customised to the needs of patient groups.

== Political career ==
In December 2006 NHS London asked Darzi to "develop a strategy to meet Londoners' health needs over the next five to ten years" and so his report Healthcare for London: A Framework for Action was published on 11 July 2007. Largely implemented, it recommended the development of academic health science centres and the introduction of more primary services in one place: polyclinics. The plan for moving care from hospitals to GP-led polyclinics was not successful. Nick Clegg called it "the central imposition of a polyclinic on every primary care trust, regardless of the geography, demographics and clinical needs of the area". However, his call for trauma, acute stroke and heart attack services to be centralised in specialist units succeeded and has been widely copied.

He was also the National Advisor in Surgery to the Department of Health. Darzi's report in this role, 'Saws and Scalpels to Lasers and Robots: Clinical case for change' (April 2007), argued for a change to the way surgery is organised to maximise patient benefits.

Darzi was granted a life peerage on 12 July 2007, taking the title Baron Darzi of Denham, of Gerrards Cross in the County of Buckinghamshire and joining the House of Lords. On 29 June 2007 Prime Minister Gordon Brown appointed him as Parliamentary Under-Secretary of State in the Department of Health. His appointment was a small part of a political shift by government to incorporate more talents, with historical predecessors such as the Ministry of All the Talents.

Darzi was tasked with leading a national review to plan the course of the NHS over a decade, reporting to the Prime Minister, Chancellor, and Secretary of State for Health in June 2008. He cooperated with the Department of Health to undertake the "NHS Next Stage Review".

Darzi was quoted in The Times as saying that "...This Review should be both clinically-led and evidence-based". The final report of the Review, High Quality Care for All, was published in June 2008 to considerable public and academic acclaim. The Financial Times stated that it was "the world's most ambitious attempt to raise the quality and effectiveness of an entire nation's healthcare". The Lancet said that:

Darzi has wisely thrown out regulation as the organising principle of the NHS. He has replaced it with quality... This cultural shift is a radical re-visioning of purpose for the NHS—away from the political command and control of processes and towards professional responsibility for clinical outcomes

Through High Quality Care for All, academics suggested that Darzi has updated traditional notions of professionalism and described a new accountability in clinical practice. Following publication, Darzi remained in his ministerial post. He was associated with the plan to develop Polyclinics in England. The plan for moving care from hospitals to GP-led polyclinics was quietly reversed when the costs became apparent, but his call for trauma, acute stroke and heart attack services to be centralised in specialist units was seen as successful and was widely copied.

In June 2009, Darzi was appointed as a member of Her Majesty's Most Honourable Privy Council. In July 2009, Darzi relinquished his post as Parliamentary Under-Secretary of State. The Prime Minister praised his "outstanding contribution" while The Guardian said that:

Instead of waging war on the medics, as his Blairite predecessors had done, Darzi invited them to take a hand in designing their own targets and bound them into reform. He stressed the quality of care after Labour's decade-long obsession with quantity. And while the drive for private involvement continued, it took a less dogmatic turn. The NHS's morale improved, as did its public standing.

Since 2018, Darzi has been leading the National Health Service's Accelerated Access Collaborative.

Darzi resigned as a Labour peer on 9 July 2019 to sit as an independent, citing alleged tolerance of antisemitism by the party leadership. Labour rejected the claims on antisemitism as "false and offensive", pointing to the extra resources put into addressing cases, the number dealt with and the low number relative to Labour's membership. He remains a non-affiliated peer as of 2024.

In July 2024 Lord Darzi was appointed to lead an independent investigation into the performance of the NHS. His report was published on 11 September 2024 and warned that despite "more resources than ever before", with funding at £165 billion a year, the NHS was in a "critical condition", with waiting lists increasing, cancer performance poor, and an increased number of staff wasting much of their time because of severe shortages of beds and diagnostics. He found an urgent need to improve productivity and move more care out of hospitals.

=== Parliamentary voting record ===
According to parliamentary monitoring website, TheyWorkForYou, as of May 2021 Darzi's voting record shows the following trends:

- consistently against measures to prevent climate change
- generally for more EU integration

=== Armenian issues ===
In October 2016 Darzi joined other prominent Armenians in calling for the government of Armenia to adopt "new development strategies based on inclusiveness and collective action" and to create "an opportunity for the Armenian world to pivot toward a future of prosperity, to transform the post-Soviet Armenian Republic into a vibrant, modern, secure, peaceful and progressive homeland for a global nation."

In November 2019, after the US House of Representatives recognized the Armenian genocide, Darzi wrote in The Guardian that he "remain[s] dismayed by the British government's refusal to acknowledge the slaughter of an estimated 1.5 million Armenians in a wave of violence that followed the fall of the Ottoman empire." He added that it is "a source of intense pain and regret to me and my compatriots that our own government persists in denying the genocide out of fear of offending Turkey."

== Global health and innovation ==
After July 2009, Lord Darzi returned to his clinical and academic work and has expanded his involvement in global health issues. In June 2010, he was appointed Chairman of the Institute for Global Health Innovation at Imperial College, a body dedicated to improving healthcare around the world and reducing health inequalities in developed and developing countries.

In November 2010, under David Cameron, Darzi became a United Kingdom Global Ambassador for Health and Life Sciences; a role he continued until 2012. In 2012 the Institute of Global Health Innovation (IGHI) hosted the inaugural Global Health Policy Summit in London, during the London 2012 Olympic Games. This event brought together global healthcare leaders, academics and industry to debate key topics on global health and included a keynote address by Prime Minister David Cameron.

In September 2013, Darzi was appointed by the Mayor of London Boris Johnson to lead a review of health and wellbeing and services in London. The London Health Commission which reported in October 2014 proposed the toughest measures seen in the UK to tackle the "obesity emergency" that leaves one in three 10-year-olds overweight or obese, including Ofsted-style ratings highlighting the best and worst schools at promoting healthy eating, and requiring chain restaurants to include "traffic light" calorie warnings on menus. He called for the Mayor to rewrite the London Plan to give borough councils greater protection in banning takeaways from within 400m of the school gates.

Also in 2013, he hosted the World Innovation Summit for Health in Doha, Qatar, under the patronage of Mozah bint Nasser Al Missned and the Qatar Foundation. More than one thousand delegates attended from industry, academia and the healthcare sector and politicians, as well as royal figures including Aung San Suu Kyi of Myanmar, The Duke of York, Princess Lalla Salma of Morocco, HRH Princess Ghida Talal of Jordan and Princess Dina Mired of Jordan.

He has also run training courses for doctors in Armenia and helped Armenian doctors come to London for clinical training. He has also performed several laparoscopic surgeries in Yerevan, and supplied hospitals in Armenia with equipment and surgical kits.

== Other activities ==
Darzi, along with Amal Clooney, was involved in the release of two Reuters journalists, Wa Lone and Kyaw Soe Oo, from Myanmar on 7 May 2019.

In 2021, Darzi commissioned a COVID-19 vaccine promotion ad for the NHS with Elton John and Michael Caine.

=== Corporate boards ===
- Evelo Biosciences, Member of the Board of Directors (since 2018)
- AbbVie, Member of the Advisory Board

=== Non-profit organizations ===
- Africa Research Excellence Fund (AREF), Member of the Advisory Panel (since 2015)
- Aurora Prize, Member of the Selection Committee (since 2015)
- Community Jameel, chairman of the advisory board
- Duke Institute for Health Innovation (DIHI), Member of the Global Advisory Board
- Engineering and Physical Sciences Research Council (EPSRC), Member
- MIT Jameel Clinic, member of the advisory board
- Rangoon General Hospital Reinvigoration Charitable Trust, Member of the Board of Trustees
- Qatar Foundation, Member of the Advisory Board
- Sidra Medical and Research Center, Vice Chair of the Board of Governors

== Awards and honours ==
In 2002, Darzi was appointed a Knight Commander of the Order of the British Empire (KBE) for his services to medicine and surgery and subsequently was created a Life Peer on 12 July 2007, as Baron Darzi of Denham, of Gerrards Cross in the County of Buckinghamshire.

The University of Bath awarded Darzi an Honorary Doctorate of Engineering in 2008.

He was appointed to Her Majesty's Most Honourable Privy Council in June 2009. Darzi was elected a Fellow of the Royal Society in 2013.

He received the Hamdan Award for Medical Research Excellence - Minimally Invasive Surgical Technology in 2004 by Hamdan Medical Award.

In January 2014, Darzi was awarded the Qatari sash of Independence by the Emir Sheikh Tamim bin Hamad Al Thani in recognition of his contribution to the development of Qatar's health sector. Darzi was named by the Health Service Journal as the 38th most influential person in the English NHS in 2015.

In the 2016 New Year Honours, he was appointed to the Order of Merit, for services to medicine.

He was chosen to carry the Royal Armills at the 2023 Coronation.

Orders of precedence in the United Kingdom
Preceded by The Lord Jones of Birmingham	Gentlemen; Baron Darzi of Denham	Followed by The Lord Janvrin
