= Polyclinics in England =

Polyclinics in England were intended to offer a greater range of services than were offered by current general practitioner (GP) practices and local health centres. In addition to traditional GP services they would offer extended urgent care, healthy living services, community mental health services and social care, whilst being more accessible and less medicalised than hospitals. A variety of models were proposed, ranging from networks of existing clinics to larger premises with several colocated general practitioner (GP) practices, more extensive facilities and additional services provided by allied healthcare professionals.

The incoming health secretary in May 2010 Andrew Lansley put on hold all plans to increase numbers of polyclinics and to relocate GPs to them pending a review of policy under the new coalition government, after a review by management consultants McKinsey revealed "NHS managers had vastly overestimated the ability of polysystems to handle the shift in care from hospitals and revolutionise GP care".

== Operational polyclinics ==
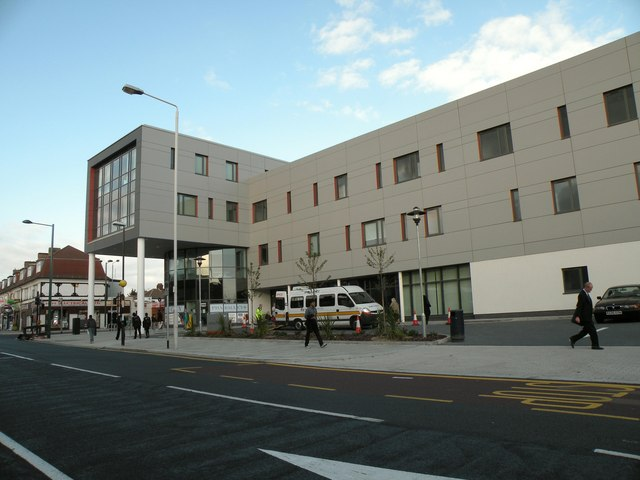
Loxford Polyclinic, Redbridge

On Wednesday 29 April 2009, the first seven polyclinics in England opened in London, marked by the opening of the Loxford Polyclinic by Lord Darzi. The seven were:

- Redbridge Primary Care Trust: Loxford Polyclinic (the first purpose-built polyclinic)
- Harrow Primary Care Trust: Alexandra Avenue Health and Social Care Centre
- Hounslow Primary Care Trust: Heart of Hounslow
- Lambeth Primary Care Trust: Gracefield Gardens Health and Social Care Centre
- Waltham Forest PCT: Oliver Road Polyclinic
- Tower Hamlets Primary Care Trust: The Barkantine Centre
- Hammersmith and Fulham Primary Care Trust: Hammersmith Centre for Health at Hammersmith Hospital (London's first hospital-based polyclinic)

== Polyclinic services ==
The polyclinic model proposed in London will provide:

- GP services – e.g. core and enhanced with extended opening hours
- Other health services – including other health professionals (e.g. ophthalmology, dentistry)
- Minor procedures
- Outpatient appointments
- Urgent care
- Diagnostics – e.g. core and enhanced testing with extended opening hours
- Community services – e.g. interactive health information, management of long term conditions, complex needs, community nursing, community mental health teams
- Co-located services – e.g. including local authority, social care, mental health, leisure and the London Ambulance Service

The government accepts that the polyclinic model may not be suitable for rural areas but may be popular in the larger conurbations.

== History ==
Health centres offering a mix of community-based health care services have existed in England since the early years of the National Health Service (NHS). They have typically provided specialist care such as ophthalmology, podiatry, dentistry, minor injuries nursing, and therefore provided services that fell between that of the GP service and those available at the hospital.

Some primary care trusts in England attempted to bring together even more services into such centres, most notably by co-locating GPs, health laboratories, pharmacies and other services under one roof. The Heart of Hounslow Centre for Health for example has GP services, outpatient care, physiotherapy, dentistry, podiatry, social care outreach, mental health services for children and a gym to help in rehabilitation. All these services take place in a purpose-built facility. However, the centre does not provide urgent care and only has a limited range of diagnostics.

Polyclinics were proposed only for London by Professor the Lord Darzi of Denham in his review of healthcare in London for NHS London: Healthcare for London: A Framework for Action. In the final report of his subsequent national review for the Department of Health, High Quality Care for All Lord Darzi has not suggested that polyclinics would be appropriate elsewhere; instead he suggests "GP-led health centres". He explained the difference between the two models to the House of Commons Health Select Committee on 19 July 2008.

A key principle of A Framework for Action is to "localise where possible, centralise where necessary." This would move "routine healthcare" away from acute hospitals and into community-based centres to provide a one-stop-shop for health care. "More complex care" would remain centralised. A key part of the plan is to extend the opening times of such centres, especially in the evenings, to make them more accessible to working people.

While polyclinics had not been widely implemented across England prior to 2008, they have existed in Australia, France, Germany (since 2004), Northern Ireland, Switzerland and Russia; and in many countries across Asia and Africa, although several of these countries are now seeking to remove them. In Russia, where they were introduced under communism, attempts were made to replace them with a more western model by the new Russian government. However, the Russian polyclinic model proved robust and the authorities' prescriptive interference failed.

== Rationale ==
The Department of Health and the government claimed that polyclinics offer:

1. A way of providing more services in the community closer to home and at more convenient times (including antenatal and postnatal care, healthy living information, community mental health services, community care, and social care and specialist advice)
2. An improved structure within which GPs and other health and social care professionals can work together
3. Improved care for patients with chronic or complex conditions
4. A shift in the focus of urgent care out of hospitals and into polyclinics.

A report by the King's Fund has questioned many of these, observing that:

1. Access to services was likely to be harder in rural areas and in urban areas where new buildings were not situated close to transport hubs
2. Simply putting healthcare professionals in the same location is in practice often not sufficient to generate co-working or integration of care
3. While the co-location of multiple services presents opportunities for delivering more integrated care, particularly for people with chronic diseases, the evidence suggests that in practice these opportunities are often lost, and accessibility of primary care is likely to be reduced for most patients if their GPs move into polyclinics, particularly in rural settings (a point emphasised in The Times)
4. There is limited evidence that quality of care for services shifted out of hospitals is comparable, and there is evidence that quality may be decreased in certain cases; the limited inspection and accreditation of out-of-hospital care is also a serious deficit in quality assurance

The report also observed that the proposals were likely to increase professional isolation, and threaten both professional development and motivation, and continuity of care, and that pre-existing problems in healthcare to do with the lack of an overall governance structure, and unclear lines of accountability had not been addressed.

It concluded that while polyclinics offered real opportunities for some health communities to establish more integrated, patient-focused care, these would only be realised with considerable investment of time, effort and resources into their planning and development, and that the primary focus should be on developing new pathways, technologies and ways of working rather than new buildings.

The Conservative Party leader David Cameron did not object in principle to the case for polyclinics but is worried that they might be imposed against the wishes of communities. He suggested that close to 1,600 GP surgeries may have to close across the country as a whole if polyclinics were established in the way the government is suggesting. The Health Minister Ben Bradshaw, however, denied that individual GP practices would be closed as patients would remain registered with their existing GPs. These figures have also been dismissed by Dr Laurence Buckman, chair of the British Medical Association's General Practitioners Committee.

== Funding ==
It was unclear whether polyclinics would be funded in addition to existing GP services or whether they will take funding away from existing practices. Although Lord Darzi claimed that their funding would be in addition to existing funding, following the publication of his report, eight London primary care trusts drew up plans to relocate more than 100 urban GP surgeries into polyclinics. The Conservative Party claimed that unless existing surgeries close, polyclinics will leave a £1.4 billion "black hole" in public finances.

== Implementation ==
Polyclinics were originally planned for and implemented in London, with every primary care trust in the country subsequently required to have at least one new "GP-led health centre". All of the first wave of polyclinics in London, which formed a pilot of the model, were of the federated/networked model and involved "existing services working more closely together".

As of August 2008, more than a quarter of PCTs had plans to implement a polyclinic or GP-led health centre, including Birmingham, Cumbria, Lincolnshire, Rochdale, Cheshire, Essex and Bolton. More than 50 PCTs admitted that they would not consult local communities over plans to build polyclinics, some citing advice from the Department of Health as the reason, despite repeated government promises that they would not be introduced without consultation.

The country-wide rollout of GP-led health centres was criticised by doctors' leaders and patient groups. Dr. Richard Vautrey, deputy chairman of the BMA, called it "a government plan that is potentially going to waste hundreds of millions of pounds of scarce NHS resources, creating very large health centres that many areas of the country simply don't need or want", while the Patients Association noted that gathering services under one roof in rural areas "may actually put patients at risk" and noted that rural patients already had to travel further and were more reliant on primary care. The other political parties have also criticised it, with the leader of the Liberal Democrats Nick Clegg calling it "the central imposition of a polyclinic on every primary care trust, regardless of the geography, demographics and clinical needs of the area" while acknowledging that they might be a good thing for people in some communities and Conservative leader David Cameron suggesting large-scale closures of existing GP surgeries.

The results of a freedom of information request by Pulse on the plans for polyclinics show that nursing staff could outnumber doctors by up to three to one. The BMA said the plans would lead to "cut-price general practice". A spokesperson for the Department of Health said "where people choose to register with a GP-led health centre, they should expect the same quality and continuity of care from GPs and other primary care clinicians as they would from any other GP practice".

On 10 September 2008, an NHS London press release and fact sheet announced details of 5 of a possible 13 polyclinics in the first wave in London. They were to be developed by the following primary care trusts:

- Harrow PCT: Alexandra Avenue
- Hounslow PCT: Heart of Hounslow
- Lambeth PCT: Gracefield Gardens
- Redbridge PCT: Loxford Centre
- Waltham Forest PCT

Also anticipated in the first wave were:

- Camden PCT: Four federated polyclinics
- Haringey PCT: Currently rethinking plans to close 37 surgeries
- Kensington and Chelsea PCT: Five surgeries to be relocated to polyclinic hub at St Charles Community Hospital

== Opinion ==
Opinion on the plans for polyclinics was polarised.

- Nigel Edwards, Policy Director NHS Confederation

Polyclinics are based on long term trends of what works best in healthcare, and in fact there are many practices successfully operating under a similar model already. As such we have been genuinely surprised to see the level of concern surrounding these proposals among the health community and patient groups. What we need now is a calm and balanced debate about how to bring out the best in our primary care services. The name may pose a problem. Polyclinics may be associated with the previous soviet system of healthcare, however what is proposed here has no real connection to this at all. While it may sound like the polyclinic system will not resemble the service currently provided by family doctors, in reality it should build on what is best in general practice. Of course this is not something that will work in every circumstance, but delivering better organised care focused on the patient is surely a good thing. This is why it is crucial that politicians and health professionals fully engage with the benefits that polyclinics can bring. Knee jerk reactions focussing on possible problems based on pre-existing agendas rather than potential solutions could seriously jeopardise progress for patients.

- Paul Ward, Deputy Chief Executive of the Terrence Higgins Trust, commented:

With HIV now a long-term condition, polyclinics have a very important role in the delivery of HIV care. Many routine services, such as regular blood tests and check ups shouldn't require a trip to a hospital-based clinic. Integrating services can only make life easier for people living with HIV so it's definitely a welcome move.

- Samantha Mauger, Chief Executive of Age Concern London, said:

We welcome the intention of providing an integrated local health centre delivering a wide range of services in a joined-up approach. If this is done with care it could benefit many older people. While older people may be worried about possible changes to the services they currently use, many suffer at present from lack of coordination between different health and social care services. The NHS needs to work with and listen to local people's views about the services to be provided. We need improved, responsive services and easy access for Londoners of all ages from all communities.

- Although government-backed, one study by Professor Martin Roland, of the University of Manchester concluded that such clinics are likely to offer poorer choice and worse access than traditional GP surgeries; and they have faced opposition from doctors, health experts, and patients.
- The British Medical Journal claimed that the government has been bringing pressure to bear on primary care trusts to implement them despite this opposition. Despite this they are a mainstay of the report by British peer Lord Darzi into the modernisation of the NHS. Bernd Rechel of the London School of Hygiene and Tropical Medicine and Martin McKee of the London School of Economics observed:

Polyclinics were a centrepiece of the Soviet model of healthcare delivery, but many countries of Central and Eastern Europe have abandoned them over the past two decades in favour of a system of general practice that draws extensively on the British model. Advisers from the World Bank, the EU, and many bilateral donors agreed that the polyclinic had failed to deliver modern, integrated health care and saw general practices as the future.

- The British Medical Association was opposed to polyclinics from the start, observing that larger clinics were already emerging where needed, that forcing their introduction was wasteful and costly, and that they would undermine the value of a relationship existing between GP and patient. They have further commented that the design of the proposals appears deliberately to disadvantage existing GPs from applying to run the clinics, leaving the way open for privatisation of GP services.
- A significant proportion of the general public are opposed to polyclinics, with more than a million signing the British Medical Association's petition against them. Press reports suggested that they were unpopular with patients, particularly the elderly, who feared polyclinics would ruin their relationship with their doctor and were finding they had to travel further to see a doctor. However, of the 4,372 individual responses and 359 organisational responses to NHS London's official consultation, 51% supported the proposal that "almost all GP practices in London should be part of a polyclinic, either networked or same-site". The consultation noted that some respondents were concerned about the effect of polyclinics on the GP-patient relationship, worse continuity of care, possible extra travel time, cost, governance, and whether the money would be better spent on improving existing services.
- The Patients Association was concerned that polyclinics could jeopardise the patient-doctor relationship which they regard as a central plank of effective and personalised care and as "central to every patient's experience of healthcare", particularly in those with long-term or complex conditions. They also observed that polyclinics are not necessary to providing one-stop care, something already delivered in the NHS at one stop shops, and that they are likely to lead to the loss of other health services in rural areas.
- The Liberal Democrats criticised polyclinics as part of the government's "obsession with imposing models of care from the centre", noting that this flies in the face of their "rhetoric on local decision-making".
- The NHS Alliance called polyclinics "lost in translation", commenting that while they are good when implemented in the right way, this "means general practices locally deciding to integrate their services" with willingness from both doctors and local people. "The BMA and patients are afraid that they might be losing the good bits of general practice – and the way that polyclinics have been implemented in some places means they have got a point."
- The Royal College of General Practitioners, who support the notion of GPs working in federations, have nonetheless condemned the government's plans for polyclinics, and have set out their own proposal for "Primary Care Federations", saying "GPs and patients must be involved in the planning, and we cannot afford for existing high quality GP practices to be destabilised".
- Opinion pieces for The Guardian have differed dramatically in tone. Polly Toynbee suggested that "it's hard to see a downside for patients" and GPs' protests are "all about profits, not patients", while George Monbiot called it the "outright privatisation of primary healthcare" and suggested it would make primary care "more expensive and less efficient" and see "those who can't afford to pay are either excluded or treated like battery pigs".
- The Independent included a balanced article on them, explaining the possible benefits and disadvantages.

== External references ==
- Polyclinics: An integrating or disintegrating force?: A Civitas debate held on 29 May 2008 at the Royal College of Surgeons of England. Chaired by Professor Aidan Halligan with contributions from Professor Steve Field, Chairman, the Royal College of General Practitioners; Professor Steve Smith, Principal, Faculty of Medicine, Imperial College London and CEO of Imperial College Healthcare NHS Trust; Dr Oliver Bernath, CEO, Integrated Health Partners; and Professor Martin Roland, Director NPCDC, University of Manchester. Commentary by Professor Sir Ian Kennedy, Chairman, Healthcare Commission.
- Ideas from Darzi: Polyclinics NHS Confederation report
- Local hospitals: lessons for the NHS, Central Middlesex Hospital case study
