= CLSC =

Free clinics and hospitals in Quebec, Canada

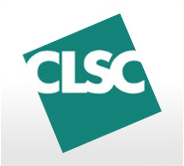
Clinic logo

CLSCs (centre local de services communautaires, local community service centre) in Quebec are free clinics and hospitals run and maintained by the Quebec government. They are a form of community health centre.

The service was launched in the early 1960s after major reforms in the health and social services system were made by the Castonguay-Nepveu Commission during the Quiet Revolution era in the 1960s. Until the commission, most health and social services had been generally under jurisdiction of religious-affiliated agencies, primarily those of the Roman Catholic Church. After the commission, the Quebec government, with several measures made by the Quebec Liberal Party of Jean Lesage, took full control of the health and social services jurisdiction and later created the CLSCs. The province also granted access to a wide variety of services for free for most citizens. The Pointe-Saint-Charles Community Clinic was a model for the system.

The network offers a wide variety of social, psychological, and health services. There are 147 CLSCs spread throughout the province.
