= Polyclinic =

Health care facility

A polyclinic (where poly means "many"; not to be confused with the homonym policlinic, where poli means "city" and which is sometimes used for a hospital's outpatient department) is a clinic or health care facility that provides both general and specialist examinations and treatments for a wide variety of diseases and injuries to outpatients and is usually independent of a hospital. When a polyclinic is so large that it is in fact a hospital, it is also called a general hospital.

The term was rare in English until recently and is still very rare in North America. Examples include the polyclinics in England (large health care centres able to provide a wider range of services than a standard doctor's (GP) office) and The Polyclinic in Seattle, Washington, US.

Most other languages use a cognate of the even rarer English term "policlinic" (spelled similarly to and pronounced the same as the English term "polyclinic") for outpatient departments (outpatient clinics) of (public) hospitals and for large independent (public) clinics for outpatients. Some languages, for example French, specifically use a cognate of "polyclinic" to refer to private outpatient clinics.

Due to the different meanings of "poly" and "poli", it was traditionally considered incorrect to use the English term "polyclinic" for European policlinics. In addition, European policlinics (called "poliklinik", "policlinique", "поликлиника" [poliklinika], or similarly in other languages) are more like hospitals or are part of a hospital and are public and therefore free or inexpensive whereas polyclinics are traditionally much less structured and comprehensive organizations consisting of a usually haphazard collection of more or less independent offices of private doctors. The polyclinics in England however use the term polyclinic more or less like the term policlinic and its cognates in other languages.
