= World Health Organization response to the COVID-19 pandemic =

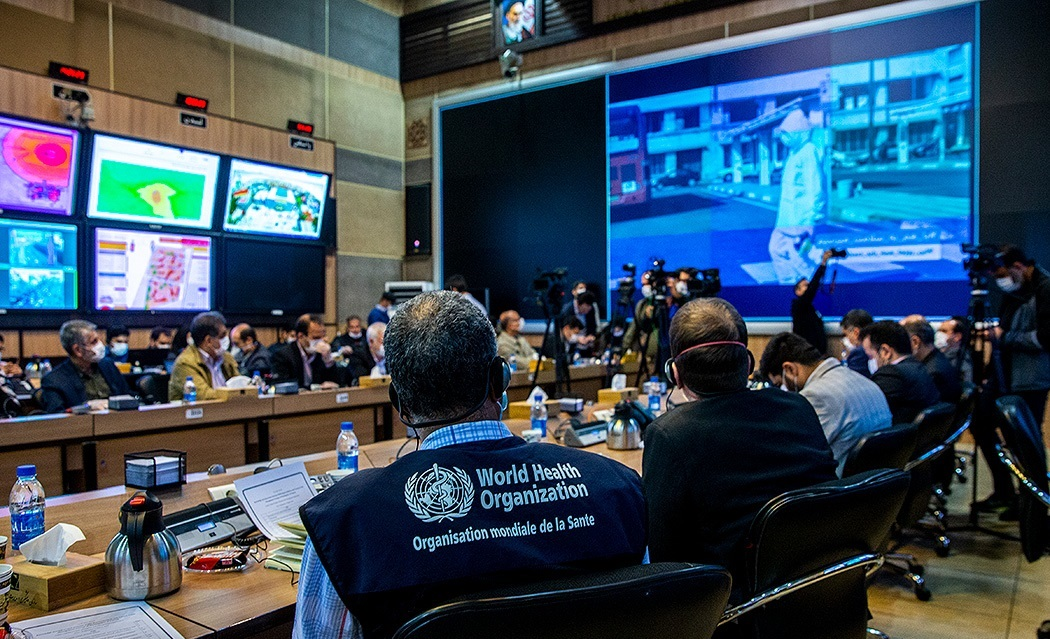
World Health Organization representatives holding joint meeting with Tehran city administrators in March 2020

The World Health Organization (WHO) is a leading organisation involved in the global coordination for mitigating the COVID-19 pandemic within the broader United Nations response to the pandemic.

On 5 January 2020, the WHO notified the world about a "pneumonia of unknown cause" in China and subsequently began investigating the disease. On 20 January, the WHO confirmed human-to-human transmission of the disease. On 30 January, the WHO declared the outbreak a Public Health Emergency of International Concern and warned all countries. On 11 March, the WHO said the outbreak constituted a pandemic. By 5 October of the same year, the WHO estimated that a tenth of the world's population had been infected with the novel virus.

The WHO has spearheaded several initiatives, such as the COVID-19 Solidarity Response Fund, to raise money for the pandemic response, the UN COVID-19 Supply Chain Task Force, and the solidarity trial for investigating potential treatment options for the disease. The COVAX program, co-led by the WHO, Gavi, and the Coalition for Epidemic Preparedness Innovations (CEPI), aims to accelerate the development and manufacture of COVID-19 vaccines and to guarantee fair and equitable access for every country in the world.

The WHO's handling of the initial outbreak required a "diplomatic balancing act" between member states, in particular between the United States and China. On 27 August 2020, WHO Director General Tedros Adhanom Ghebreyesus announced that an independent expert committee would be established to examine various aspects of the international treaty that governs preparedness and response to health emergencies. A WHO-led international mission arrived in China in January 2021 to investigate the origins of the COVID-19 pandemic, and released preliminary findings the following month.

== Background ==
The World Health Organization has provided state-endorsed guidance and has set norms and standards on outbreak preparedness and responses. This was by its role of providing guidance and assisting with coordination in controlling the international spread of diseases. However, the WHO does not have the power to legally enforce its recommendations.

== Timeline ==
=== December 2019 ===
- On 30 December 2019, the WHO obtained a Chinese report about seven or more cases of atypical pneumonia.
- On 31 December 2019, authorities in China reported a cluster of cases of pneumonia of unknown cause. Taiwan's CDC emailed the WHO a few hours later, restating the earlier Chinese report and requesting more information.

=== January 2020 ===
- On 1 January 2020, the WHO set up the Incident Management Support Team for dealing with the disease outbreak on an emergency basis.
- On 5 January 2020, the WHO notified all member states about the new outbreak of an unknown pneumonia virus in the Hubei province of China.
- On 10 January, the WHO issued a comprehensive package of guidance to countries on how to test for potential cases. By this date, the WHO warned of the risk of human-to-human transmission.
- On 12 January, Chinese scientists shared the genetic sequence of the new virus, and the WHO asked a German team to design a test.
- On 13 January, the WHO confirmed the first case of the disease outside of China, in Thailand.
- On 14 January, Maria Van Kerkhove, an American infectious disease epidemiologist of the WHO, told in a press briefing that "it is possible that there is limited human-to-human transmission, potentially among families, but it is very clear right now that we have no sustained human-to-human transmission" WHO recommended countries to take precautions due to the precedent of human-to-human transmission set during earlier SARS and MERS outbreaks. On the same day, the WHO's Twitter account stated that "preliminary investigations conducted by the Chinese authorities have found no clear evidence of human-to-human transmission".
- On 20 January, the WHO tweeted that it was "now very clear from the latest information that there is at least some human-to-human transmission" that has occurred, given that healthcare workers had been infected.
- On 22 January, the WHO issued a statement disclosing that the data "suggests that human-to-human transmission is taking place in Wuhan", and called for more investigation.
- On 22 January, an emergency committee was convened to assess whether the outbreak constituted a public health emergency of international concern (PHEIC). The committee could not reach a consensus.
- On 27 January, the WHO assessed the risk of the outbreak to be "high at the global level".
- On 30 January, the emergency committee reconvened and advised that the outbreak constituted a Public Health Emergency of International Concern. WHO warned that "all countries should be prepared for containment".

=== February 2020 ===
- On 3 February, World Health Organization Director-General Tedros Adhanom Ghebreyesus said there was no need to "unnecessarily interfere with international travel and trade" in trying to control COVID-19. He said, "We call on all countries to implement decisions that are evidence-based and consistent." At the time, China was "facing increasing international isolation due to restrictions on flights to and from the country, and bans on travellers from China". WHO's long-standing policy was that travel restrictions are generally ineffective and can be counter-productive.
- On 12 February, a Research and Innovation Forum was convened by the WHO, which included researchers and funders, to fund priority research for stopping the outbreak and preventing future outbreaks.
- From 16 to 24 February, the WHO–China Joint Mission travelled to China and created a report about the evolution of the outbreak in China.

=== March 2020 ===
- On 2 March, WHO Director-General Tedros announced that containment of the virus must still be the international top priority.
- On 3 March, the WHO released a Strategic Preparedness and Response Plan to help protect countries with weaker health systems. The WHO Director-General stated that the latest global death rate of the new coronavirus outbreak, 3.4%, was far higher than the seasonal flu which has a rate of less than 1%. The WHO also announced a severe shortage of personal protective equipment due to panic buying and hoarding, which was endangering medical workers.
- On 6 March, the Director-General of the World Health Organization (WHO) announced that the agency was working with the World Economic Forum to engage private companies globally in meeting the demand for medical products.
- On 7 March, the WHO stated that the global number of confirmed cases of the new coronavirus disease, COVID-19, had surpassed 100,000, calling it a "sombre moment".
- On 9 March, the WHO and ICAO published a reminder statement to caution against the breach of the 2005 International Health Regulations.
- On 11 March, the WHO confirmed coronavirus disease 2019 as a pandemic. The Director-General of the WHO called on governments to change their course by taking "urgent and aggressive action".
- On 12 March, the WHO stated that the COVID-19 pandemic could be controlled if countries took the pandemic seriously. This came after some countries did not take adequate measures to slow transmission, and also after the WHO had stated the outbreak had not reached the status of a pandemic.
- On 13 March, the WHO launched COVID-19 Solidarity Response Fund to support their work in containing the 2019-20 coronavirus pandemic.
- On 16 March, the WHO issued advice on 'Five Things You Should Know Now about the COVID-19 Pandemic' and on safeguarding mental health during the pandemic, while the WHO Director-General "blasted" the slow virus testing response and stressed, "Once again, our message is: test, test, test."
- On 18 March, the WHO launched the Solidarity Trial, an international clinical trial to find an effective treatment for coronavirus disease.
- On 19 March, the WHO Director-General reported that China had reported no new domestic cases and stated that the WHO was working to ensure the supply chain for protective equipment and tests.
- On 20 March, the Director-General announced the 'tragic milestone' of 200,000 reported cases of COVID-19.
- On 23 March, the World Health Organization (WHO) and international football's governing body, FIFA, launched a joint campaign, 'Pass the Message to Kick Out Coronavirus'.
- On 30 March, the World Health Organization (WHO) reiterates the recommendation of not wearing face masks unless they are sick with COVID-19 or caring for someone who is sick.

=== April 2020 ===
- On 1 April, the WHO reported that deaths from COVID-19 had more than doubled in the previous week and would soon reach 50,000 globally, with the global caseload heading towards one million.
- On 3 April, the WHO announced that it would work together with UNICEF on COVID-19 response through the Solidarity Response Fund. In a joint statement, the UN refugee agency (UNHCR), the International Organization for Migration, the UN human rights office (OHCHR), and the World Health Organization stressed that "refugees, migrants and displaced persons are at heightened risk of contracting the new coronavirus disease" as health systems threatened to be overwhelmed.
- By 7 April the WHO had accepted two diagnostic tests for procurement under the Emergency Use Listing procedure (EUL) for use during the COVID-19 pandemic, in order to increase access to quality-assured, accurate tests for the disease. On World Health Day, the WHO and UN Secretary-General António Guterres highlighted the work of the world's medical professionals and urged greater support for nurses and other frontline workers, as well as concern over the lack of personal protective equipment and intimidation and threats.
- On 8 April, the WHO warned that the number of COVID-19 cases in Africa had now increased to over 10,000, with over 500 dead. Responding to criticism, the WHO Director-General warned against politicizing COVID-19 as unity is the "only option" to defeat the pandemic, emphasizing, "please quarantine politicizing COVID". He outlined five main reasons why countries need the WHO. UN Secretary-General António Guterres urged global support for the WHO, describing the UN health agency, which has led the multilateral response since the beginning, as "absolutely critical" in overcoming COVID-19.
- 9 April marked the 100th day since the WHO was notified of the first cases of 'pneumonia of unknown cause' in China. The Director General reported that the WHO would release an updated strategy for fighting the pandemic. WHO launched the UN COVID-19 Supply Chain Task Force to scale up the supply of life-saving products for COVID-19.
- On 10 April, the WHO Director-General laid out six factors for consideration when lifting lockdowns, including that transmission is controlled and sufficient public health and medical services are available.
- On 13 April, the Director-General of the WHO outlined the agency's latest advice, stressing a mix of social distancing, testing, contact tracing, and isolation. The WHO, the UN Children's Fund (UNICEF), and other health partners supporting the Measles & Rubella Initiative (M&RI) warned that over 117 million children in 37 countries risked missing out on a measles vaccine.
- On 14 April, The first of the UN's World Food Programme (WFP) and WHO "Solidarity Flights" carried urgently needed medical equipment to Africa, part of a UN-wide initiative.
- On 15 April, The Director-General of the WHO stated it was reviewing the impact of the United States withholding funding and upheld the importance of international solidarity in tackling the COVID-19 pandemic one day after the US announced that it was cutting funding, pending a review of how the WHO responded to the initial outbreak in China. The WHO warned of a potential "second wave" of COVID-19 infections in an update to its strategic advice to governments, as some European countries began to relax lockdown measures.
- On 19 April, the Director-General of the WHO urged the G20 leading global economies to plan to ease lockdowns against COVID-19 only as part of "a phased process".
- On 20 April, the WHO reiterated its stance on the lifting of lockdown measures, stating, "We want to re-emphasize that easing restrictions is not the end of the epidemic in any country". The heads of multiple major UN humanitarian agencies and offices, including the WHO, the World Food Programme (WFP), and the Office for Coordination of Humanitarian Affairs (OCHA), launched an urgent appeal for $350 million to support global aid hubs to help those vulnerable during the COVID-19 pandemic.
- On 22 April, the Director-General of the WHO warned against 'complacency' as countries continue to battle COVID-19 and citizens grew weary of stay-at-home measures.
- On 23 April, WHO accidentally posted draft reports of results from COVID-19 trials in China, which were then removed from the website. An article on the findings was published, and Gilead Sciences released a statement saying that "the study investigators did not provide permission for the publication of the results. Furthermore, we believe the post included inappropriate characterizations of the study." Gilead indicated that there were plans to publish the data in a peer-reviewed outlet.
- On 24 April, WHO released a scientific brief arguing against immunity passports due to insufficient evidence. They also launched the Access to COVID-19 tools accelerator, a collaboration to accelerate the development and production of vaccines, diagnostics, and therapeutics for COVID-19.
- On 27 April, the WHO warned about the pandemic's impact on health services, especially for children, particularly vaccination.
- On 28 April, the WHO launched a major UN-led initiative to secure supplies of key medical equipment for 135 low to medium-income countries responding to the COVID-19 pandemic.
- On 30 April, the third meeting of the Emergency Committee convened by the WHO Director-General, agreed that the pandemic still constitutes a PHEIC.

=== May 2020 ===
- On 1 May, international experts on the COVID-19 Emergency Committee advised the WHO to work to identify the animal origins of the virus causing the COVID-19 pandemic and its transmission to humans.
- On 4 May, the WHO welcomed a 7.4 billion Euro pledge by world leaders for COVID-19 treatments, while the UN Secretary-General warned that five times that amount would be required, urging the "most massive public health effort in history".
- On 6 May, the Director-General of the WHO reported that, since the start of April, an average of 80,000 cases of COVID-19 per day had been reported to the WHO.
- On 8 May, the Director-General of the WHO stated that the lessons learned from the eradication of smallpox four decades previously could be applied to the coronavirus pandemic.
- On 11 May, the WHO Director-General warned the resurgence of COVID-19 cases in South Korea, China and Germany followed the lifting of stay-at-home restrictions, indicating their complexity.
- On 18–19 May, the 73rd World Health Assembly was held online. Australia and the EU tabled a seven-page motion which was supported by over 120 delegations. The Australian delegation hardened the tone of the original European text, to include the qualifiers "impartial, independent and comprehensive evaluation", to the text of OP9.10 "as appropriate, to review experience gained and lessons learned from the WHO-coordinated international health response to COVID-19", "using existing mechanisms (including an IHR Review Committee and the Independent Oversight and Advisory Committee for the WHO Health Emergencies Programme)". The motion was supported by China but not by the United States, and passed by the WHA with unanimity. The final motion calls for the review to be coordinated by the WHO itself.
- On 21 May, the WHO and the UN refugee agency (UNHCR) signed a new pact, an update, and expansion of a 1997 agreement, funded by the COVID-19 Solidarity Response Fund, to better protect approximately 70 million people affected by COVID-19 in low and middle-income countries with vulnerable health systems.
- On 22 May, the Director-General of the WHO reiterated that the COVID-19 pandemic was disrupting access to routine immunization services worldwide, increasing the risk of potentially lethal diseases like diphtheria, measles, and pneumonia.
- On 27 May, the WHO Foundation, an independent body, was launched to help fund the WHO as "an integral part of the UN agency's resource mobilization strategy to broaden its donor base".
- On 29 May, thirty countries and multiple international partners signed up to support the WHO-backed COVID-19 Technology Access Pool (C-TAP), a "one-stop shop" for sharing data, intellectual property, and scientific knowledge to counter the disease.

=== June 2020 ===
- On 1 June, the WHO published research finding that the fight against COVID-19 had severely disrupted services to prevent and treat non-communicable diseases like cancer, diabetes, and hypertension, which kill over 40 million people each year. Dr. Michael Ryan, WHO Executive Director, highlighted that Central and South America were now 'intense zones' for COVID-19 transmission.
- On 3 June, on World Bicycle Day, the WHO highlighted the potential for bicycles to transform the way the world moves around and create a healthier, more sustainable future after the pandemic.
- On 5 June, the WHO recommended mask-wearing for members of the public, a change from their previous recommendations, on the basis of increased evidence. The organization still had reservations, though, and cautioned that mask use by the general public was still "not yet supported by high quality or direct scientific evidence".
- On 8 June, the WHO warned that the COVID-19 pandemic was worsening globally, with more than 136,000 cases recorded on 7 June, the highest ever in a single day.
- On 10 June, the WHO reported that research was continuing to determine how the COVID-19 virus can be transmitted by people who show no symptoms of the disease (asymptomatic transmission).
- On 11 June, the WHO Africa regional office warned that COVID-19 was accelerating in Africa, with more than 200,000 cases and more than 5,600 deaths.
- On 12 June, the WHO warned about the pandemic's impact on women, children, and young people as it continued to escalate.
- On 15 June, the WHO Director-General emphasized the risk of the southern hemisphere influenza season, as "Co-circulation of COVID-19 and influenza can worsen the impact on health systems that are already overwhelmed".
- On 17 June, the WHO welcomed results on the use of dexamethasone in the sickest COVID-19 patients, while warning it is 'no cure-all'.
- On 19 June, the WHO warned that the world was entering "a new and dangerous phase" of the COVID-19 pandemic, as infection rates continued to climb and over 150,000 new cases of the disease were reported the previous day, the highest single daily total to date.
- On 22 June, the WHO reported the largest single-day increase in coronavirus cases over 21 June, registering more than 183,000 new infections in 24 hours, with approximately 8.8 million cases in total worldwide, with more than 465,000 deaths.
- On 24 June, the WHO Director-General warned that the world was on track to reach 10 million coronavirus cases within the next week, a "sober reminder" that as research continues into therapeutics and vaccines, maximum efforts were required immediately to suppress transmission and save lives.
- On 26 June, the WHO and partners warned that more than $31 billion would be needed over the next year to develop effective medicines for COVID-19, and to make them globally available to all people.

=== July 2020 ===
- On 1 July, the Director-General stated that some nations battling the COVID-19 pandemic who had been taking a "fragmented approach" to suppressing the deadly virus, "face a long, hard road ahead".
- On 7 July, the WHO announced that it would shortly issue a brief on the modes of transmission of the new coronavirus, including the matter of airborne transmission.
- On 10 July, the WHO announced that COVID-19 cases globally had more than doubled in the previous six weeks, reaching 12 million.
- On 14 July, in response to a press question, Dr. Michael Ryan, executive director of the WHO Health Emergencies Programme, called for the issue of school reopenings to be decided as part of comprehensive, data-driven COVID-19 public health strategies, rather than politically driven decision-making processes.
- On 15 July, the WHO and UNICEF called for immediate efforts to vaccinate all children in order to avoid the pandemic worsening access, a problem affecting over 100 countries.
- On 20 July, with Latin America now being the epicentre of the pandemic, the WHO expressed concern at COVID-19's impact on indigenous people in the Americas.
- On 23 July, as global cases topped 15 million, the Director-General of the WHO urged people to play their part in preventing the further spread of the pandemic, warning of no return to "the old normal".
- On 27 July, the WHO urged all countries to make the necessary "hard choices" in order to avoid a new wave of lockdowns and beat the pandemic, as it announced nearly 16 million cases of reported infection worldwide and over 640,000 deaths.
- On 29 July, the WHO stated that the first wave of COVID-19 was still continuing and that the virus was likely not impacted by seasonal changes like other respiratory diseases; it also urged significantly more respect for physical distancing measures to prevent the virus's transmission.
- On 30 July, the Director-General of the WHO warned that, while older people were among those at highest risk of COVID-19, younger generations are "not invincible".

=== August 2020 ===
- On 3 August, the WHO's Emergency Committee on COVID-19 met to review the current coronavirus pandemic at what the Director-General called "a sobering moment" due to the pandemic's massive direct and ripple effects, with a warning of "no silver bullet".
- On 5 August, the WHO reported that a new "surge team" of leading UN health experts was traveling to South Africa to help with the COVID-19 response there, as the country was now among the top five of the world's most affected countries.
- On 6 August, addressing the Aspen Security Forum, consisting of top-level present and former United States government officials, the WHO's Director-General appealed to countries to unite against the disease, stressing that there were more than 18.5 million cases of COVID-19 worldwide and 700,000 deaths.
- On 13 August, the Director-General stated that the agency's main mission was now "focused on shepherding global vaccine candidates through the necessary trials", then "guaranteeing rapid, fair and equitable access" to vaccines for every country.
- On 18 August, the WHO's Director-General warned against "vaccine nationalism" in the COVID-19 pandemic, stating that he had written to UN Member States, urging them to join the COVAX Global Vaccines Facility, a mechanism to guarantee fair access to effective immunization for all countries.
- On 20 August, the WHO and UNICEF, citing research, urged African governments to promote a safe return of schoolchildren to classrooms while limiting the spread of COVID-19.
- On 24 August, the WHO urged greater investment in the global COVID-19 vaccine facility, the COVAX Global Vaccines Facility, in which 172 countries are now participating and which aims to deliver two billion doses in 2021.
- On 25 August, the WHO announced only a slim possibility of COVID-19 reinfection, citing documented cases of 1 in over 23 million.
- On 27 August, the WHO announced the setting up of an independent expert Review Committee to examine aspects of the international treaty that governs preparedness and response to health emergencies in order to prepare for future pandemics.
- On 31 August, the WHO Director-General warned that kickstarting economies without a COVID-19 plan was "a recipe for disaster", while advising on the measures that individuals, communities, and governments, communities could take to ensure safety.

=== September 2020 ===
- On 4 September, the WHO announced that the COVID-19 pandemic had caused massive global disruption in diagnosing and treating people with deadly but preventable diseases, including over half of cancer patients.
- On 7 September, the Director-General announced that the Review Committee of the International Health Regulations, designed to prepare for the next pandemic, is commencing its work, as he urged more investment in public health.
- On 18 September, the Director-General presented the second report of the WHO and World Bank-backed Global Preparedness Monitoring Board, A World in Disorder, which recommends developing "muscle memory", i.e., repetition, as a "key to pandemic response".
- On 21 September, the Director-General unveiled the Vaccines Global Access Facility (COVAX), part of the ACT Accelerator, to deliver two billion doses of coronavirus vaccine globally by the end of 2021.
- On 25 September, the WHO revised its guidelines to recommend countries prioritize the elderly and health workers In the face of a potential global shortage of influenza vaccines and the ongoing COVID-19 pandemic.

=== October 2020 ===
- On 2 October, the Director-General wished both President Trump and the First Lady of the United States, "a full and swift recovery" and called for strong leadership and comprehensive strategies so that countries could "change the trendlines of the COVID-19 pandemic".
- On 5 October, the WHO estimated that 10% of the world's population may have been infected with coronavirus, with 10 countries accounting for 70% of all reported cases and mortality, and only three countries accounting for half. The WHO also announced survey results showing that the pandemic has interrupted essential mental health services in 93% of countries surveyed.
- On 10 October, as infections rapidly rose in the Americans and in Europe, the WHO rejected the concept of "herd immunity" through exposure to infection as a solution to the pandemic, describing it as "unethical" and "not an option". He stated, "Herd immunity is a concept used for vaccination, in which a population can be protected from a certain virus if a threshold of vaccination is reached". He explained that herd immunity is obtained by protecting people from the virus, "not by exposing them to it". He added, "Letting the virus circulate unchecked, therefore, means allowing unnecessary infections, suffering and death" and that "Never in the history of public health has herd immunity been used as a strategy for responding to an outbreak, let alone a pandemic".
- On 13 October, in a joint statement, the WHO, together with the Food and Agriculture Organization, International Fund for Agricultural Development and the International Labour Organization called for "global solidarity and support, especially with the most vulnerable in our societies" and highlighted that tens of millions of people, especially in the developing world, risk falling into extreme poverty, with nearly half of the global 3.3 billion workforces at risk of losing their jobs.
- On 15 October, the WHO announced COVID-19 had become the fifth highest cause of death in Europe, with nearly 700,000 cases being reported in the week, the highest rate since March.
- On 19 October, as COVID-19 cases continued to increase rapidly, particularly in Europe and North America, the Director-General of the WHO warned governments and people globally not to relax, and to protect those hospitalized and front-line workers.

=== November 2020 ===
- On 23 November, Tedros warned that the poor must not be left out in the rush for vaccines.

=== December 2020 ===
In December 2020, it was reported that a WHO-led international mission was expected to travel to China in the first week of January 2021 to investigate the origins of the COVID-19 pandemic.

On 31 December 2020, the World Health Organization granted emergency use listing for the Tozinameran – COVID-19 mRNA vaccine (nucleoside modified) – Comirnaty.

=== January 2021 ===
In January 2021, WHO director-general Tedros Adhanom Ghebreyesus said he had called on China to allow the investigation team in and expressed his dismay after China blocked the arrival of the mission's 10 virologists. A few days later, permission was granted for the team to arrive. Mike Ryan, WHO emergencies chief, said that the purpose of the trip was to find "the answers here that may save us in future - not culprits and not people to blame". A WHO-affiliated health expert said expectations that the team would reach a conclusion from their trip should be "very low". U.S. officials denounced the investigation as a "Potemkin exercise" and criticised the "terms of reference" allowing Chinese scientists to do the first phase of preliminary research. Epidemiologist Fabian Leendertz, who is part of the team, clarified that the mission is a data-based investigation and advised against "Trump style finger-pointing." Leendertz also made clear that the WHO would manage the complex and sensitive relations with China over access issues amid some people's concerns that China might try to obstruct the work.

At the WHO's annual executive board meeting, Tedros warned of a "catastrophic moral failure" if rich countries continued to hoard vaccine supplies at the expense of poor countries, an issue that the WHO's COVAX vaccine-sharing scheme intended to avoid. The COVAX program aims to distribute 2 billion doses of the COVID-19 vaccine for free or at a reduced cost by the end of 2021 but has struggled to raise funds to subsidize the costs. It was revealed during the meeting that the WHO lacked an adequate financing system after its largest donor, the U.S., announced its planned withdrawal (later canceled) over claims that the organization was heavily influenced by China during the coronavirus pandemic.

=== February 2021 ===
The investigation team released preliminary findings, concluding that COVID-19 likely came from bats.

On 15 February 2021, the World Health Organization authorized two versions of the AstraZeneca/Oxford COVID-19 vaccine for emergency use.

=== March 2021 ===
The investigation team released their report, the WHO-convened Global Study of the Origins of SARS-CoV-2, on 30 March. The report found that COVID-19 likely did not originate at Huanan Seafood Market, but that a lab leak origin was "extremely unlikely". The report recommended livestock farms in Southeast Asia as a direction for further research on the virus's origins.

The World Health Organization expressed support for a future pandemic treaty to address the problems exposed by the COVID-19 pandemic.

On 12 March 2021, the World Health Organization authorized the Janssen COVID-19 vaccine Ad26.COV2.S for emergency use.

=== April 2021 ===
The World Health Organization encouraged individual donors to contribute to COVAX through the "Go Give One" campaign.

On 30 April 2021, the World Health Organization granted emergency use listing for the Moderna COVID-19 mRNA Vaccine (nucleoside modified).

=== May 2021 ===
On 7 May 2021, the World Health Organization authorized the Sinopharm BIBP vaccine for emergency use.

=== July 2021 ===
The WHO issued a proposal for the second phase of research into the virus's origins.

=== October 2021 ===
On 14 October 2021, WHO nominated 26 experts to join the Scientific Advisory Group on the Origins of Novel Pathogens (SAGO). Michael Ryan said that the task force could be the "last chance to understand the origins" of COVID-19.

=== November 2021 ===
In a special session of the World Health Assembly, the WHO member states agreed to launch negotiations to draft an international agreement "to strengthen pandemic prevention, preparedness and response" (commonly referred to as the pandemic treaty). The first official meeting will occur in March 2022 and the aim is to finalize a draft agreement by May 2024 for consideration by the 77th World Health Assembly.

=== December 2021 ===
On 22 December 2021 the WHO issued an update clarifying that COVID-19 disease was low in children and adolescents, and that vaccination in those age groups was not recommended, sparing valuable resources for other populations most in need.

On 23 December 2021, the WHO confirmed that COVID-19 is airborne.

=== May 2023 ===
On 5 May, the WHO declared an end to the global COVID-19 emergency.

== Initiatives ==
WHO releases daily situation reports and holds press conferences for updating the media about the pandemic. WHO has shipped more than two million items of personal protective equipment and one million diagnostic test kits to over 120 countries. WHO has launched multilingual e-learning courses about various aspects of COVID-19, including for preparedness and response. By April 2020, WHO's Solidarity Response Fund had gathered more than US$140 million from more than 200,000 individuals and organizations.

=== Safe Hands Challenge ===
Safe Hands Challenge, a campaign launched by WHO that urges everyone to wash their hands regularly, saw participation from celebrities. WHO has an active presence on all social media channels, where they work to counter misinformation. In order to counter myths related to COVID-19, WHO has created resources for the public. WHO has partnered with Lady Gaga, who will perform a TV concert for fundraising for health workers. By 7 April, she raised US$35 million for the cause.

=== Go Give One campaign ===
The WHO Foundation and the Bill & Melinda Gates Foundation launched the "Go Give One" campaign in April 2021, encouraging individual and corporate donations to purchase COVID-19 vaccines for "everyone, everywhere." Funds raised are directed to the COVAX AMC managed by Gavi, the Vaccine Alliance.

The campaign raised over US$7 million within the first two months of its launch; $1.5 million of which came from individuals, 27% of which were British donors. In December 2021, Virgin Atlantic, the Pacific Asia Travel Association and Collinson (a travel services company) formed the Global Travel Sector Vaccine Coalition to fundraise on behalf of the travel industry. They were later joined by Priority Pass.

Additional corporate partners of the campaign include Allen & Overy, Benevity, Blue State Digital, Charities Aid Foundation, DFS Group, eBay, Etsy, Facebook, Global Citizen, Mastercard, PagerDuty, Pandemic Action Network, Religions for Peace, Russell Reynolds Associates, Salesforce, Workday and XpresCheck.

== People ==
Tedros Adhanom Ghebreyesus, WHO's Director-General, has been leading the organization's efforts to contain the coronavirus pandemic. Along with Tedros, Michael J. Ryan, executive director of WHO's Health Emergencies Programme and Maria Van Kerkhove, technical lead of COVID-19 Response, appear in press conferences at WHO Headquarters in Geneva. The WHO–China Joint Mission in February 2020 was headed by Bruce Aylward of WHO and Wannian Liang of China's National Health Commission.

== Reception ==
The WHO's handling of the pandemic has come under criticism amidst what has been described as the agency's "diplomatic balancing act" between "China and China's critics", as ongoing tension between China and the United States creates challenges in controlling the virus. Critics charge the organization with being "too close to Beijing". Former Deputy Prime Minister and Finance Minister of Japan, Tarō Asō, said that some people have called WHO the "China Health Organization", because of what he described as its close ties to Beijing. Initial concerns included the observation that while the WHO relies upon data provided and filtered by member states, China has had a "historical aversion to transparency and sensitivity to international criticism". In January, some WHO officials had internal discussions of insufficient information and significant delays in information provided by the Chinese government. Jeremy Youde, a global health politics researcher and dean at the University of Minnesota Duluth, said that WHO officials may have calculated that "naming and shaming" would not get the Chinese government to cooperate, and that instead of highlighting the lack of information sharing, the WHO may have intentionally decided to praise China's efforts and thank Beijing for its cooperation to keep the Chinese government on board and engaged with the WHO.

In response to the criticisms, in mid-February, WHO director-general Tedros Adhanom stated that China "doesn't need to be asked to be praised. China has done many good things to slow down the virus. The whole world can judge. There is no spinning here," and further stated that "I know there is a lot of pressure on WHO when we appreciate what China is doing but because of pressure we should not fail to tell the truth, we don't say anything to appease anyone. It's because it's the truth." Some observers have said WHO is unable to risk antagonizing the Chinese government, as otherwise, the agency would not have been able to stay informed on the domestic state of the outbreak and influence response measures there, after which there would have "likely have been a raft of articles criticizing WHO for needlessly offending China at a time of crisis and hamstringing its own ability to operate." Through this, experts such as Dr. David Nabarro have defended this strategy in order "to ensure Beijing's co-operation in mounting an effective global response to the outbreak". Osman Dar, director of the One Health Project at the Chatham House Centre on Global Health Security defended WHO's conduct, stating that the same pressure was one "that UN organisations have always had from the advanced economies."

In April, African leaders expressed support for the WHO amid the pandemic, with the African Union saying the organization had done "good work" and Nigerian President Muhammadu Buhari calling for "global solidarity".

US President Donald Trump praised the WHO in the outbreak but later criticized the organization's response. On 14 April 2020, he announced that the U.S. would halt funding to WHO while reviewing its role in "severely mismanaging and covering up the spread of the coronavirus." A week earlier, at a press briefing, Trump had criticized WHO for "missing the call" on the coronavirus pandemic and had threatened to withhold U.S. funding to the organization; on the same day, he also tweeted a complaint that China benefits disproportionately from WHO, saying that "WHO really blew it." The U.S. Congress had already allocated about $122 million to the WHO for 2020, and Trump had previously proposed in the White House's 2021 budget request to reduce WHO funding to $58 million. Trump's announcement drew condemnation from world leaders and health experts. It came amid constant criticism of his failure to prepare for the outbreak in the U.S., the country worst affected in terms of infection numbers as of 15 April 2020. The WHO called the decision "regrettable" and stated that the organization first alerted the world on 5 January when a cluster of 41 cases of atypical pneumonia was singled out from the millions of similar cases that occur every year. American law professor Lawrence O. Gostin said that Trump's decision was "the prime example of why we are in this mess". He said the WHO is hesitant to cause any offense for fear of losing funding.

In April 2020, the Sydney Morning Herald reported that while the Australian government valued the World Health Organization and planned to continue contributing funds, they had lost confidence in the organization's global headquarters. The Australian government planned to push for the WHO to be given greater power, similar to UN weapons inspectors, to reduce reliance on individual national governments. The Australian government also planned to push for a review of the global handling of the outbreak, including by the WHO.

In May 2020, German news magazine Der Spiegel reported that China's paramount leader Xi Jinping had asked WHO director-general Tedros Adhanom, in a 21 January phone call, to hold off on issuing a global warning or reporting human-to-human transmission. Citing sources within the German foreign intelligence service Bundesnachrichtendienst (BND), Der Spiegel said that the world "lost four to six weeks" in the fight against the novel coronavirus as a direct result of China's lack of transparency. The WHO denied that Tedros and Xi had spoken on that date and said that the two had never spoken by phone. The WHO also noted that China had already confirmed human-to-human transmission on 20 January. Citing the conflict over Taiwan, Der Spiegel also questioned whether the WHO can be as non-political as what it claims in one of its mottos.

On 19 May 2020, Donald Trump reaffirmed his criticism concerning the WHO's management of COVID-19 in a letter to director-general Tedros Adhanom. The letter was based on a selective version of the pandemic, ignored or glossed over the WHO's clear warnings about the dangers of the contagion, and falsely claimed that Taiwan had warned the WHO of human-to-human transmission on 31 December. The Lancet, which was critical of Trump's ongoing WHO aid freeze, rebutted the claim that the WHO had ignored a December 2019 report by the journal, stating its first reports were published on 24 January. Trump threatened to withdraw the United States from WHO if the organization did not "commit to major substantive improvements within the next 30 days." After 11 days, on 29 May, Trump announced plans to cut ties between the United States and WHO, though it was unclear whether he had the authority to do so. Trump's successor Joe Biden reversed the decision in January 2021, saying that the WHO "plays a crucial role" in fighting COVID-19 and other public health threats.

The WHO has been criticized for not stating that the COVID-19 outbreak was a pandemic until significantly after it had already clearly become one. On 18 January 2021, an independent panel led by Helen Clark and Ellen Johnson Sirleaf criticised the WHO for not declaring an international emergency sooner and called for its reform. The panel questioned why the Emergency Committee of WHO only met in the third week of January 2020, and an international emergency was not declared until its second meeting on 30 January. It also criticised China for not applying public health measures more forcefully in January 2020. The report says that "the global pandemic alert system is not fit for purpose" and that the "World Health Organization has been underpowered to do the job."

Norwegian lawmakers nominated the WHO and COVAX for the 2021 Nobel Peace Prize, for their work to provide COVID-19 vaccines to low-income countries.

The WHO has been criticized for taking two years to say that COVID-19 is airborne.

According to Juliette Genevaz, a political scientist specialising in contemporary China, the World Health Organization is considered to take similar lines to the Chinese government's.

=== Taiwan ===
The Taiwanese government protested WHO's "very high" risk rating for Taiwan in February 2020, at which time Taiwan had a very small number of cases compared to China. Taiwanese officials and some analysts have said that the exclusion of Taiwan from WHO, on the basis of pressure from China, has increased the risk of Taiwan missing disease-related updates. WHO has responded that Taiwan has been given access to all coronavirus data and information, and said that Taiwanese experts were "involved in all of our consultations ... so they're fully engaged and fully aware of all of the developments in the expert networks." China had previously allowed Taiwan to be an observer at the World Health Assembly before relations deteriorated in 2016. The US President Donald Trump accused the WHO of late response to the pandemic and said that Taiwan sent an email to the WHO on 31 December warning of human-to-human transmission, a claim that The Guardian and the fact-checking website FactCheck.org said was false. The Taiwanese government said it sent an email on 31 December 2019 to inform the WHO of its understanding of the disease while also requesting further information, including whether it could be transmitted between people. The WHO said the email it received from Taiwan made no mention of human-to-human transmission.

== International Treaty for Pandemic Prevention, Preparedness and Response ==
The COVID-19 pandemic stressed the need for a globally coordinated governance response to future outbreaks. In this vein, and to respond to the shortcomings of international health architecture, the multiple WHO member states called for a new international treaty for pandemic preparedness and response, to "foster an all-of-government and all-of-society approach, strengthening national, regional and global capacities and resilience to future pandemics". International expert consultations to support and inform the WHO are underway.

In December 2021, the second special session of the World Health Assembly agreed to begin negotiations to draft such an international agreement.

== See also ==
- World Health Organization response to the COVID-19 pandemic in Africa
