= Virginia Hinshaw =

American microbiologist

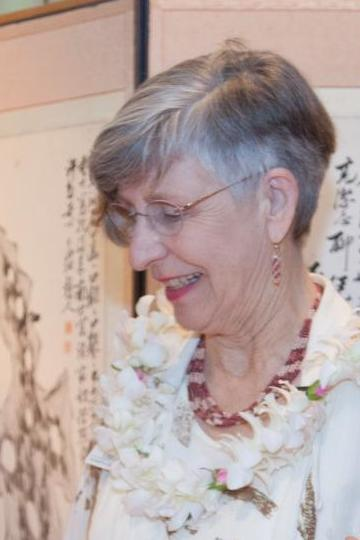
Virginia Hinshaw

Virginia S. Hinshaw is a scientist with expertise in microbiology, virology and influenza resulting in numerous publications. She served as vice-chancellor at U of Wisconsin Madison and chancellor at University of Hawai'i Manoa campus.

== Career ==
Hinshaw earned a BS in laboratory technology in 1966, and an MS in 1967. She worked as a research and clinical microbiologist at the Medical College of Virginia. Later, she returned to school and earned the PhD in microbiology from Auburn University in Alabama in 1973.

In 1985, she joined the faculty of the UW-Madison School of Veterinary Medicine. Her research focused on influenza viruses and approaches to vaccines. Her work has been published in numerous journals including the Journal of Virology, Virology, and Intervirology. She worked internationally on influenza virus surveillance in collaboration with the WHO and served as a Fellow for the Promotion of Science in Japan through the NIH.

== Leadership ==
In 1988, Hinshaw served as interim associate dean for research and graduate studies for the School of Veterinary Medicine at UW-Madison. She was named as an associate vice chancellor, then in 1995 named vice chancellor for research at the University of Wisconsin-Madison from 1995 to 2001. While Hinshaw was at UW-M, the university's annual research budget increased from $370 million in 1995 to $476 million in 2000. Hinshaw invigorated the tech-transfer programs in the UW triad and expanded opportunities for graduate students by creating a "K through Infinity" program to help graduate students extend research experiences to the classroom. In addition, Hinshaw increased the number of women faculty in campus leadership positions. She took charge of The Why Files, a web-based effort to make scientific research accessible to the public. UW-Madison Chancellor John Wiley called Hinshaw a 'wise and effective leader'.

Hinshaw served as provost and executive vice chancellor at the University of California-Davis from 2001 to 2007. As provost, she oversaw the campus's $2.3 billion budget, was responsible for the UC Davis Health System, resource management, planning and strategic leadership of academic direction and programs. She initiated and led development of the campus's first strategic plan for budget planning, assessment and communication.

Hinshaw served as the Chancellor of the University of Hawaiʻi at Mānoa, beginning in 2007 and ending in 2012. She led the campus through state budget cuts and resulting financial challenges. Hinshaw led the school through the renewal of a 10-year accreditation from the Western Association of Schools and Colleges in July 2011.

In 2009 Hinshaw served as national co-chair of the Association of Public and Land-Grant Universities’ Energy Initiative Advisory Committee. Her role was to advance sustainability and maximize the contributions of public research institutions to the energy independence effort. Following her Chancellorship, she resumed her faculty position in the Department of Tropical Medicine at the University of Hawai'i at Manoa John A. Burns School of Medicine. As of 2012, Hinshaw serves as faculty in the Dr. Rosita Leong Mini-Medical School on Healthy Aging. She advocates for research and education, particularly in the area of cancer research. The goal of the Mini-Medical school is to inform Hawai'i's citizens with information to maintain health and well-being as they age.

== Legacy ==
The Chancellor Virginia S. Hinshaw Endowed Scholarship was established in honor of Hinshaw's tenure as Chancellor at the University of Hawai'i at Manoa. This scholarship is intended to benefit students engaged in biomedical research graduate studies.
