= Liang Wannian =

Chinese epidemiologist

- 梁萬年
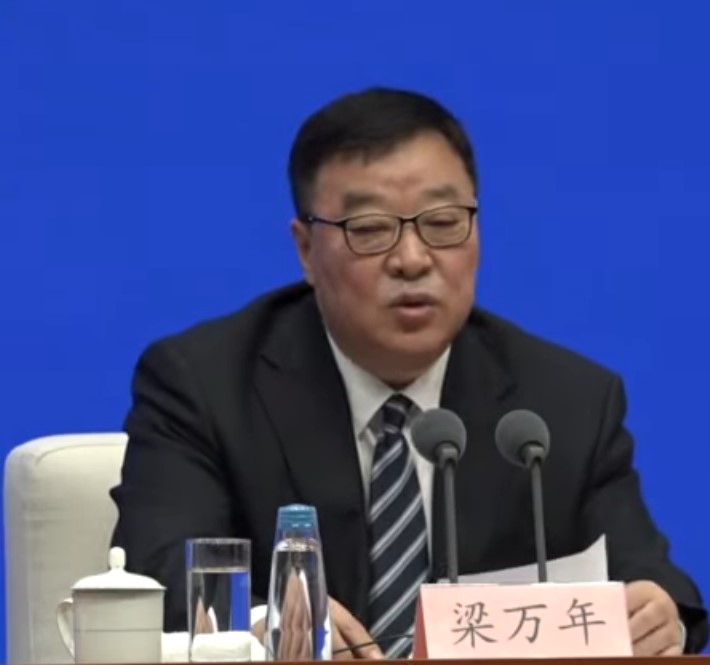
- Liang at the press conference of the State Council Information Office on 29 April 2022

Head, National Health Commission COVID Response Team

Personal details
- Born: January 1961 (age 65) Anhui, China
- Party: Chinese Communist Party
- Education: Anhui Medical University, Peking Union Medical College

Liang Wannian (simplified Chinese: 梁万年; traditional Chinese: 梁萬年; pinyin: Liáng Wànnián; born January 1961) is a Chinese epidemiologist, Executive Vice Dean at Tsinghua University's Vanke School of Public Health, and former lead of the Chinese National Health Commission's COVID-19 Response Expert Team.

== Education and career ==
Liang obtained a Bachelor of Public Health from Anhui Medical University in 1983, Master of Epidemiology from Anhui Medical University in 1986, and Ph.D of Epidemiology and Health Statistics from Peking Union Medical College in 2003.

=== COVID-19 ===
Liang is a key architect of China's zero COVID strategy and has been a regular face at Chinese Government press conferences on the progress of containing the virus since 2020.

Liang was team leader of the Chinese side of the joint expert team of WHO-convened Global Study of Origins of SARS-CoV-2, which was later mired in controversy for its inconclusive results, dissolved, and regrouped as the Scientific Advisory Group for Origins of Novel Pathogens.

In March 2022, Liang was dispatched to Hong Kong by the Central Government of China to help when a wave of Omicron infections surged out of control.

== See also ==
- National Health Commission
- Zero COVID
