= World Health Organization response to the COVID-19 pandemic in Africa =

On 5 January 2020, the World Health Organization (WHO) notified the world about "pneumonia of unknown cause" in China and subsequently followed up with investigating the disease. On 20 January, the WHO confirmed human-to-human transmission of the disease. On 30 January, the WHO declared the outbreak a Public Health Emergency of International Concern and warned all countries to prepare. On 11 March, the WHO said that the outbreak constituted a pandemic. By 5 October the same year, the WHO estimated that a tenth of the world's population had been infected with the novel virus.

The WHO has spearheaded several initiatives like the COVID-19 Solidarity Response Fund to raise money for the pandemic response, the UN COVID-19 Supply Chain Task Force, and the solidarity trial for investigating potential treatment options for the disease.

In responding to the outbreak, the WHO has had to deal with political conflicts between member states, in particular between the United States and China. On May 19, the WHO agreed to an independent investigation into its handling of the pandemic. On August 27, the WHO announced the setting up of an independent expert Review Committee to examine aspects of the international treaty that governs preparedness and response to health emergencies.

== Timeline ==
- On 27 July, the Head of WHO claimed he would reconvene the agency's emergency committee to assess the COVID-19 pandemic.
- On 3 August, the Head of WHO claimed there was a possibility a 'silver bullet' answer to defeating the COVID-19 virus might never happen.
- On 6 August, the Head of WHO claimed economic recovery all over the world could come quicker if there was COVID-19 vaccine available to all.
- On 21 August, UNICEF and WHO urged the governments in Africa reopen schools.
- On 22 August, the head of WHO claimed he hopes COVID-19 would be over in less than two years.
- On 26 August, WHO claimed it was set to partner the World Federation of Science Journalists in the communication of intricate science of COVID-19 accurately as it evolves.
- On 1 September, WHO published its first survey on the impact of COVID-19 on health systems in about 105 countries' reports.
- On 11 September, WHO and CDC launched a new laboratory network aiming to enforce genome sequencing of the virus in Africa.
- On 14 September, according to WHO, the number of daily worldwide infections reached a new record with more than 300,000 confirmed new infections.
- On 20 September, WHO agreed on rules for testing of African herbal remedies to fight against the virus.
- On 25 September, WHO brought together a panel of experts who listed some factors that might have pushed down the spread of COVID-19 in Africa.
- On 6 October, WHO claimed one in ten persons across the globe might have contracted the virus.
- On 13 October, the Head of WHO ruled out a strategy of achieving herd immunity by infection, rather than by vaccination.
- On 16 October, WHO cautioned that Africa can not stand a second wave of the pandemic.
- On 31 October, the Director of WHO in Africa claimed innovations in COVID-19 played a role in the spread of the virus in Africa.
- On 12 November, the Head of WHO cautioned countries to continue observing the safety protocols to stop the spread of the virus as the globe awaits the vaccine.
- On 19 November, the Regional Director for WHO for Africa predicted a rise in the virus during the Christmas and New Year holidays due to the increase of gatherings.
- On 24 November, the Regional Director for WHO for Africa called for cautiousness because there was a possibility of rise in the COVID-19 cases.
- On 27 December, the Chief of WHO claimed COVID-19 would not be the final pandemic.
- On 28 December, WHO claimed there was the need for Africa to reinforce public health measures to curb the spread of infections especially as there was gathering and traveling for celebrations.
- On 11 January, WHO claimed herd immunity to COVID-19 would not be gained in 2021.
- On 23 January, WHO gave funds to the Ghana National Ambulance Service to purchase fuel.
- On 24 January, WHO donated medical items and supplies to Ghana's Ministry of Health.
- On 27 January, WHO issued some guidelines for confirmed and suspected COVID-19 patients, and also cautioned against continuous transmission of the virus.
- On 30 January, WHO claimed it was safe for pregnant women to take the COVID-19 vaccine.
- On 15 February, it was reported WHO claimed about 90 million COVID-19 vaccine would be brought to Africa.
- On 22 February, WHO in collaboration with WFP established the UN COVID-19 Field Hospital in Accra.
- On 23 February, WHO with its partners decided to launch a program concerning side effects among persons in some countries because of the COVID-19 vaccination, and Ghana was part.
- On 24 February, WHO and UNICEF praised Ghana for receiving COVID-19 vaccines from COVAX.
- On 26 February, WHO partnered with UNFPA to provide 1,000 copies of COVID-19 Response Plan and 500 IT tablets to Ghana's Ministry of Health.
- On 17 March, an official at WHO, Richard Mihigo encouraged Governments in Africa 'not to lose faith' in the AstraZeneca after some countries in Europe suspended the vaccine.
- On 21 March, an official of WHO claimed almost 7 million doses of the COVID-19 doses had been administered to certain groups in Africa.
- On 26 March, WHO urged for fairness in the access of the COVID-19 vaccines in Africa.
- On 10 April, the representative of WHO in Ghana cautioned Ghanaians to take the pandemic seriously. Africa's WHO regional director bemoaned the slow pace of the continent's vaccination process.
- On 12 April, Ghana received assorted intensive care equipment from WHO.
- On 22 April, WHO advised countries in West Africa to strengthen their laboratories.
- On 24 April, WHO urged African countries not to destroy expired COVID-19 vaccines.
