= Jean-Claude Manuguerra =

French virologist

- Born: Paris, France
- Education: École nationale vétérinaire d'Alfort; Paris XII Medical School; University of Paris-Sud
- Occupation: Researcher
- Organization(s): Institut Pasteur, Paris
- Known for: Chairperson of GOARN (2012–2013), Vice-chair of WHO SAGO (2021–2025)
- Notable work: Virology
- Title: Professor

Jean-Claude Manuguerra is a French microbiologist, virologist and researcher. He heads the Environment and Infectious risks unit (ERI) as a professor at the Institut Pasteur in Paris, France. The unit also hosts the Laboratory dedicated to the Urgent Response to Biological Threats (CIBU) and the National Reference Centre for Hantaviruses. From November 2021 to July 2025, he served as one of the 27 members for the first term of the WHO Scientific Advisory Group for the Origins of Novel Pathogens (SAGO) in the role as vice-chair. The group was put together by the WHO to research the origins of SARS-CoV-2, the virus behind the COVID-19 pandemic, in addition to other pathogens. He continues to be a member, for the second term of the group, which began in 2026.

He worked as co-director of the National Influenza Center for Northern France between 1994 and 2003, which was one of 13 laboratories making up the WHO Laboratory Network on Severe Acute Respiratory Syndrome (SARS). He was sent to Hanoi / Vietnam in 2003 for the control of the outbreak of SARS.

In 2012 he took on the role of editor-in-chief at the virology journal Intervirology.

Since 2016 he has been a member of the Board of Governors at Institut Pasteur Paris, serving as vice-chair from October 2025.

== Education ==
Manuguerra graduated as doctor of veterinary medicine at the Paris XII Medical School, Créteil in 1989. He then moved into the field of microbiology, with an MsC in 'Microbial Ecology and antimicrobial agents' from the University of Paris XI (Paris-Sud) in 1987. He then obtained a PhD, from the same institution, on ‘Pharmaceutical sciences - Microbial Ecology, Anti-Infectious Agents’ in 1992.

During his time at Institut Pasteur, he gained additional academic education with the Institut Pasteur Diploma in Medical Virology (1989), the IFSBM Diploma in Higher BioMedical Training (1992) and Habilitation à diriger la recherche (Accreditation to supervise research - HDR) from the University of Paris XI (Paris-Sud) in 2007.

== Career ==
In 1989 Manuguerra joined the Viral Ecology Unit at the Institut Pasteur, as a Fellow through the ROUX Foundation. He worked initially on Influenza viruses, with a specific focus on influenza C. After he completed his PhD in 1992, through the University of Paris XI (Paris-Sud), he moved into a post-doctoral role at the Division of Virology at the British National Institute for Medical Research, London (UK).

The Laboratory for Urgent Response to Biological Threats (CIBU) was created in 2002, and continues to be directed by Manuguerra at Institut Pasteur. CIBU was created to assist with epidemics, accidents or deliberate use of pathogens with a potential to seriously harm Public Health. It was put together in light of the terrorist attacks in 2001, and the increasing possibility of bioterrorism threats. The laboratory is staffed with scientific specialists and technical experts on call 24/7.

In 2013 Manuguerra created the expertise and research unit 'Environment and Infectious risks' (ERI) at Institut Pasteur. The CIBU laboratory is located within the unit, which also includes the French National Reference Centre for Hantaviruses. Projects of the ERI unit center on the circulation and persistence of pathogens with epidemic potential in their environment, outside and inside the host, and the identification and characterization of pathogens with innovative broad-spectrum tools. Over the course of time, Manuguerra has worked on viruses, particularly focusing on respiratory viruses (influenza viruses and SARS-CoV-1 / CoV-2), also on Mpox virus (monkeypox), Ebola disease virus, hantaviruses and the main arboviruses. He has a number of publications resulting from techniques used in the identification of viruses.

Manuguerra and his team responded to the largest Ebola outbreak at the time in Guinea, West Africa (2014). They provided laboratory assistance in the capital Conakry, and the center of the outbreak in Macenta.

WHO created the Scientific Advisory Group for the Origins of Novel Pathogens (SAGO) in 2021. The main focus of the group was to research the origin of pathogens, with a specific focus on SARS-CoV-2. Manuguerra served as member and vice-chair during the lifetime of the group (2021–2025). Concluding in 2025, SAGO published its findings into the origin of COVID-19 in the journal Nature (February 2026). He is a SAGO member for the group beginning in 2026.

Between 2000 and 2018 he was member of the steering committee of the Global Outbreak Alert and Response Network (GOARN), which responds to threatening epidemics, serving as chairman between June 2012 and December 2013.

He is coauthor of the French book 'Les virus émergents' (Emerging viruses), published in 2006 and linked to a number of patents.

== Additional roles ==
Manuguerra has acted in additional roles, as Corresponding Member of the French Veterinary Academy (since 2005), member of the French Scientific Committee of the French Laboratory Network involved in bioterrorism (since 2005), French Representative to the Laboratory Network of the Global Health Security Action Group of the G7 plus Mexico (since 2006), Head of one of the three laboratories constituting the WHOCC for Reference and research on Arboviruses and Viral Hemorrhagic Fevers at Institut Pasteur / Paris (2008–2012), Member of the Steering Committee of the Global Alert and Response Network (GOARN) coordinated by WHO, acting as chair in 2012 / 2013 (2000–2018), President of the Expert Panel of the French Pandemic Planning Committee, Paris / France (2003–2010).

In 2014 Manuguerra was head of the human virology network for the EU MediLabSecure project. The project evolved, in 2025, into the EU OneHealthSecure project, where he is one of the principal investigators. One Health refers to the links between human, animal and environmental health. The project uses the idea of One Health for the prevention of vector borne diseases.

== Memberships ==
Member of the French Society for Microbiology (1987–present). He was its Secretary General (1998–2001) and member of the Board of directors (1998–2004)

== Recognitions ==
Knight of the French Légion d’Honneur in 2008, for his contribution working against infectious diseases.
Knight of the French National Order of Merit in 2003 following his mission to Vietnam during the outbreak of Severe Acute Respiratory Syndrome (SARS) in 2003.
