= Observer status =

Privilege for non-members of an organization

Observer status is a privilege granted by some organizations to non-members to give them an ability to participate in the organization's activities. Observer status is often granted by intergovernmental organizations (IGO) to non-member states and international nongovernmental organizations (INGO) that have an interest in the IGO's activities. Observers generally have a limited ability to participate in the IGO, lacking the ability to vote or propose resolutions.

== United Nations ==
=== United Nations General Assembly ===
The United Nations General Assembly may grant entities observer status. The United Nations welcomes many international agencies, entities, and two non-member states as observers, State of Palestine and Holy See. Observers have the right to speak at United Nations General Assembly meetings, but not to vote on resolutions.

Non-member observer states are free to submit a petition to join as a full member at their discretion. At present, the State of Palestine and the Holy See are the observer states at the United Nations, Also, Holy See includes both state as Vatican City and sovereign entity. Switzerland also maintained such status until it became a member state in 2002. Among others, the Sovereign Military Order of Malta and the European Union also have observer status; they are not states under international law, but they are sovereign entities.

Observer status is granted by a United Nations General Assembly resolution at some point in time. Other international organizations (including other UN agencies) may also grant observer status.

=== World Health Organization ===
The World Health Organization (WHO) Constitution does not recognise an observer status but the Rules of Procedure of its highest decision-making body World Health Assembly (WHA) give the Director-General right to invite observers to the annual Assembly meeting, provided that they are "States having made application for membership, territories on whose behalf application for associate membership has been made, and States which have signed but not accepted the Constitution."

==== Republic of China ====
From 1997 to 2008, the Republic of China (ROC), more commonly known as Taiwan, applied for observer status in the WHO every year, under different names including "Republic of China", "Taiwan Health Entity" and "Taiwan". All these efforts failed, mainly due to firm objections from the People's Republic of China (PRC) which does not recognize the ROC and considers Taiwan as one of its provinces. The Cross-Strait Relations (between the PRC and ROC governments) significantly improved in 2008 and 2009, and the PRC government agreed to negotiate over this issue. On April 29, 2009, the Director-General, Margaret Chan invited the Department of Health of the ROC to attend the 2009 World Health Assembly under "Chinese Taipei", a compromised name which both the PRC and ROC accept. This status only lasted for eight years and ended in 2016 following the election of DPP presidential candidate Tsai Ing-wen.

== See also ==
- Consultative status
- Taiwan and the World Health Organization
- United Nations General Assembly observers
