= World Society for Virology =

Non-profit organization connecting virologists worldwide

- Founded: May 6, 2017; 9 years ago
- Founder: Ahmed S. Abdel-Moneim
- Purpose: "To connect virologists worldwide".
- Region served: Worldwide
- Website: www.ws-virology.org

The World Society for Virology (WSV) is a non-profit organization that connects virologists worldwide. It was established in 2017 to create an international network of virologists without restrictions based on income or geographic location.

== History and activities ==
The society's first committee meeting was held in August 2019 at the Karolinska University Hospital in Stockholm, Sweden.

International conferences organized by the society include:

- WSV2021: Tackling Global Virus Epidemics (held virtually, June 16–18, 2021)
- WSV2023: One Health, One World, One Virology (June 15–17, 2023, at Rīga Stradiņš University in Riga, Latvia)
- WSV2025: The Virosphere of Our Cellular World (May 6–8, 2025, at the National Institute of Biotechnology Malaysia, Kuala Lumpur, Malaysia)

In February 2020, the society signed a memorandum of understanding with the International Vaccine Institute to collaborate on virology research and vaccine accessibility.

== Membership and partnerships ==
The society has members from 96 countries. Membership is open to scientists, researchers, and postgraduate students involved in virology.

The WSV lists the following as partner societies:

- African Virologists Network
- American Society for Virology
- Argentinian Society for Virology
- Australian Virology Society
- Brazilian Society for Virology
- Canadian Society for Virology
- Chilean Society for Microbiology
- Chinese Society for Virology (Division of the Chinese Society for Microbiology)
- Colombian Association for Virology
- Egyptian Society for Virology
- European Society for Clinical Virology
- European Society for Virology
- Finnish Society for Study of Infectious Diseases
- Indian Virological Society
- Iranian Society for Virology
- Korean Society of Virology
- Latin American Society for Travel Medicine (SLAMVI)
- Mexican Society of Virology
- Middle East, Eurasia and Africa Influenza Stakeholders Network (ME'NA-ISN)
- Moroccan Association of Infectious Pathology and Clinical Immunology
- Societas Biochemica, Biophysica et Microbiologica Fenniae
- Société Marocaine de Virologie (SMaV)
- South African Society for Virology
- Spanish Society for Virology
- Swedish Society for Virology

== Affiliated journals ==
Virology, published by Elsevier, is the official journal of the society. The WSV also has affiliations with Tumour Virus Research (Elsevier) and npj Viruses (Nature Portfolio).

== Presidents ==
The following have served as presidents of the society:

- 2017–2020: Ahmed S. Abdel-Moneim (Sultan Qaboos University and Beni-Suef University)
- 2020–2022: Anupam Varma (Indian Agricultural Research Institute)
- 2022–2024: Richard Kuhn (Purdue University)
- 2024–2026: Maria Söderlund-Venermo (University of Helsinki)
- 2026–2028: Marietjie Venter (University of the Witwatersrand)
