= Maria Van Kerkhove =

American epidemiologist (born 1977)

Maria D. Van Kerkhove
- Born: Maria Rosanne DeJoseph; February 20, 1977 (age 48); New Hartford, New York, U.S.
- Education: Cornell University (BS, 1999); Stanford University (MS, 2000); London School of Hygiene and Tropical Medicine (PhD, 2009)
- Spouse: Neil Van Kerkhove (m. 2003)
- Children: 2
- Scientific career
- Thesis: H5N1/highly pathogenic avian influenza in Cambodia : evaluating poultry movement and the extent of interaction between poultry and humans. (2009)

Maria DeJoseph Van Kerkhove (born February 20, 1977) is an American infectious disease epidemiologist. With a background in high-threat pathogens, Van Kerkhove specializes in emerging and re-emerging infectious diseases and is based in the Health Emergencies Program at the World Health Organization (WHO). She is the technical lead of COVID-19 response and the head of emerging diseases and zoonosis unit at WHO.

== Early life and education ==
Van Kerkhove was born Maria Rosanne DeJoseph in New Hartford, New York. In 1999, she received a B.S. in biological sciences from Cornell University.

In 2000, she received an M.S. in epidemiology from Stanford University School of Medicine.

In 2009, she earned a Ph.D. in infectious disease epidemiology from the London School of Hygiene & Tropical Medicine, where she wrote her thesis on the avian flu in Cambodia.

== Career ==
Van Kerkhove began her research career while an undergraduate student at Cornell University. She worked as a research assistant with Eloy Rodriguez studying the medical plants of the Amazon. As a masters student, she continued as a research assistant at Stanford University Medical School.

From 2000 to 2005, Van Kerkhove was a senior epidemiologist at Exponent's health sciences practice in New York City. After this, she worked as an epidemiologist at the Institut Pasteur de Cambodia from 2006 to 2008, while conducting field studies on H5N1 for her Ph.D.

Van Kerkhove was a senior research fellow in the Medical Research Council Centre for Outbreak Analysis and Modelling at Imperial College London from 2009 to 2015. She specialized in Ebola, Marburg, influenza, meningitis, MERS-CoV, and yellow fever. In April 2009, she began working as a technical consultant to the World Health Organization (WHO) in its Global Capacities, Alert and Response Cluster. In 2013, she was a technical consultant for WHO as a member of the MERS-CoV task force.

From 2015 to 2017, Van Kerkhove was the head of the Outbreak Investigation Task Force at the Institut Pasteur's Center for Global Health, conducting field research into surrounding zoonoses, respiratory viruses and emerging/re-emerging viruses such as Zika, MERS-CoV, Ebola and Marburg. She specialized in field research to gather data on the highly pathogenic avian influenza H5N1 (HPAI/H5N1), with a focus on transmission risk from poultry to humans.

Van Kerkhove has been an honorary lecturer at Imperial College London since 2015. She has been Scientist, Technical Lead MERS-CoV at WHO in Geneva, Switzerland, since March 2017. She is currently the head of the Emerging Diseases and Zoonoses Unit in the WHO Health Emergencies Programme. She also serves as the COVID-19 technical and health operations lead. As part of her work with WHO, Van Kerkhove appears in regular press conferences by WHO regarding the COVID-19 pandemic. Van Kerkhove has provided answers to common questions about the pandemic. Van Kerkhove spent two weeks in China in February 2020 to better understand the COVID-19 pandemic and to understand how China was trying to control the virus.

== Personal life ==
Van Kerkhove lives in Geneva, Switzerland, with her husband Neil and two sons.

== Selected works and publications ==
- Van Kerkhove, Maria D (2009). H5N1/Highly Pathogenic Avian Influenza in Cambodia: Evaluating poultry movement and the extent of interaction between poultry and humans (PDF) (PhD thesis). London: University of London: London School of Hygiene & Tropical Medicine. doi:10.17037/PUBS.00682389. Archived from the original (PDF) on 2020-04-13.
- WHO Ebola Response Team; Agua-Agum, J; Ariyarajah, A; Blake, IM; Cori, A; Donnelly, CA; Dorigatti, I; Dye, C; Eckmanns, T; Ferguson, NM; Fraser, C; Garske, T; Hinsley, W; Jombart, T; Mills, HL; Nedjati-Gilani, G; Newton, E; Nouvellet, P; Perkins, D; Riley, S; Schumacher, D; Shah, A; Thomas, LJ; Van Kerkhove, MD (7 January 2016). "Ebola Virus Disease among Male and Female Persons in West Africa". The New England Journal of Medicine. 374 (1): 96–8. doi:10.1056/NEJMc1510305. PMC 4812164. PMID 26736011. Wikidata ()
- Aguanno, Ryan; ElIdrissi, Ahmed; Elkholy, Amgad A.; Ben Embarek, Peter; Gardner, Emma; Grant, Rebecca; Mahrous, Heba; Malik, Mamunur Rahman; Pavade, Gounalan; VonDobschuetz, Sophie; Wiersma, Lidewij; Van Kerkhove, Maria D. (November 2018). "MERS: Progress on the global response, remaining challenges and the way forward". Antiviral Research. 159: 35–44. doi:10.1016/j.antiviral.2018.09.002. PMC 7113883. PMID 30236531.
- Bernard-Stoecklin, Sibylle; Nikolay, Birgit; Assiri, Abdullah; Bin Saeed, Abdul Aziz; Ben Embarek, Peter Karim; El Bushra, Hassan; Ki, Moran; Malik, Mamunur Rahman; Fontanet, Arnaud; Cauchemez, Simon; Van Kerkhove, Maria D. (14 May 2019). "Comparative Analysis of Eleven Healthcare-Associated Outbreaks of Middle East Respiratory Syndrome Coronavirus (Mers-Cov) from 2015 to 2017". Scientific Reports. 9 (1): 7385. Bibcode:2019NatSR...9.7385B. doi:10.1038/s41598-019-43586-9. PMC 6517387. PMID 31089148. Wikidata ()
- Farag, Elmoubasher; Nour, Mohamed; Islam, Md. Mazharul; Mustafa, Aya; Khalid, Minahil; Sikkema, Reina S.; Alhajri, Forhud; Bu-Sayaa, Abdulla; Haroun, Mohamed; Van Kerkhove, Maria D.; Elkholy, Amgad; Malik, Sk. Mamunur R.; Reusken, Chantal; Koopmans, Marion; AlHajri, Mohd M. (June 2019). "Qatar experience on One Health approach for middle-east respiratory syndrome coronavirus, 2012–2017: A viewpoint". One Health. 7 100090. doi:10.1016/j.onehlt.2019.100090. PMC 6462540. PMID 31011617. Wikidata ()
- Ramshaw, Rebecca E.; Letourneau, Ian D.; Hong, Amy Y.; Hon, Julia; Morgan, Julia D.; Osborne, Joshua C. P.; Shirude, Shreya; Van Kerkhove, Maria D.; Hay, Simon I.; Pigott, David M. (13 December 2019). "A database of geopositioned Middle East Respiratory Syndrome Coronavirus occurrences". Scientific Data. 6 (1): 318. Bibcode:2019NatSD...6..318R. doi:10.1038/s41597-019-0330-0. PMC 6911100. PMID 31836720. Wikidata ()
- Memish, Ziad A; Perlman, Stanley; Van Kerkhove, Maria D; Zumla, Alimuddin (March 2020). "Middle East respiratory syndrome". The Lancet. 395 (10229): 1063–1077. doi:10.1016/S0140-6736(19)33221-0. PMC 7155742. PMID 32145185.
- Elkholy, Amgad A.; Grant, Rebecca; Assiri, Abdullah; Elhakim, Mohamed; Malik, Mamunur R.; Van Kerkhove, Maria D. (March 2020). "MERS-CoV infection among healthcare workers and risk factors for death: Retrospective analysis of all laboratory-confirmed cases reported to WHO from 2012 to 2 June 2018". Journal of Infection and Public Health. 13 (3): 418–422. doi:10.1016/j.jiph.2019.04.011. PMC 7102841. PMID 31056437.

== See also ==
- Tedros Adhanom – Ethiopian public health official (born 1965)
- Bruce Aylward – Canadian physician and epidemiologist
- Michael J. Ryan (doctor) – Irish epidemiologist (born 1965)
