= Marietjie Venter =

South African Virologist

- Born: Marietjie Van Aardt Venter; South Africa
- Education: University of Pretoria; University of the Witwatersrand
- Occupation: Researcher
- Employer: University of the Witwatersrand
- Organization(s): Infectious Diseases and Oncology Research Institute - University of the Witwatersrand
- Known for: Virology
- Notable work: Chairperson at SAGO for WHO
- Title: Professor

Marietjie Van Aardt Venter or simply Marietjie Venter, is a South African virologist and researcher. She serves as a distinguished professor and research chair in Emerging Viral Threats & One Health (EViTOH) in the Infectious Disease and Oncology Research Institute (IDORI) at the University of the Witwatersrand. Since 2021, she has chaired the SAGO, a WHO permanent advisory body on the origins of emerging infectious diseases including COVID-19. Prior to this, Venter has been serving in the Department of Medical Virology at the University of Pretoria since 2005, leading the Zoonotic Arbo & Respiratory Viruses research program and co-founding the Centre for Viral Zoonoses and is the Director for the Centre for Emerging arbo and respiratory virus research (CEARV) in an extraordinary Professor position at University of Pretoria.

Between 2009 and 2014, Venter served as co-director of the Centre for Respiratory Diseases and Meningitis at NICD and from 2014 to 2016 One Health Programme director, for the Global Disease Detection Centre, of the US-CDC in South Africa. In 2013, she won the NSTF award for the best output by a senior scientist within the previous 5 to 10 years in South Africa. Since 2020, she has been the vice president of the World Society for Virology responsible for Africa, and the president-elect of the organization since 2024.

== Education ==
In 1993, Venter attended the University of Pretoria, in South Africa where she graduated with a bachelor's degree and master's of science in Genetics, in 1997 and 1999 respectively. Subsequently, she further enrolled in the University of the Witwatersrand, South Africa to pursue a PhD in Medical Virology, where she earned the degree in 2003. She received postdoctoral training at the National Institute of Allergy and Infectious Diseases (NIAID) in Bethesda, Maryland at the National Institute of Health on West Nile virus in 2003.

== Activities ==
While she was an associate professor at the University of Pretoria, Venter established the Zoonotic Arbo & Respiratory Viruses research program in 2006, a program which has conducted studies on various emerging infectious diseases. Venter was eventually promoted to full professor in 2016 when she returned to UP full-time and she co-founded the Centre for Viral Zoonoses in the department of Medical Virology at the University of Pretoria heading the One Health program on zoonotic Arbo and respiratory viruses. In October 2023, Venter launched the Centre of Emerging Arbo and Respiratory Virus Research (CEARV) at the University of Pretoria where she has served as the director and extraordinary professor since April 2024. She established the Emerging Viral Threat, One Health surveillance and vaccines (EViTOH) division under the Infectious Disease and Oncology Institute (IDORI) at the University of the Witwatersrand in April 2014. Apart from chairing the SAGO, she also serves as a Special Advisor to the WHO on Respiratory Syncytial Virus surveillance on the Global Influenza Surveillance Platform and is a Member of the Technical Advisory Group on Arboviruses (TAG-Arbo).

== Career ==
After graduating with a master's degree in Genetics at the University of Pretoria, in 1999, Venter joined the National Institute for Communicable Diseases. She served as head of the respiratory syncytial virus laboratory until 2002. Subsequently, she was promoted to position of principal scientist in the Special Pathogens Unit at the institution, where she served until 2005. In November 2005, Venter joined the University of Pretoria as a senior lecturer in the department of Medical Virology.

In addition, in 2009, Venter returned to the National Institute for Communicable Diseases where she was appointed head of the Centre for Respiratory Diseases and Meningitis. She served in this position until 2014 when she joined the US-Centers for Disease Control and Prevention in South Africa, Venter served as the One Health program director for the Global Disease Detection Centre until 2016. She accepted a position as a distinguished Professor and Research chair in Emerging Viral Threats and One Health (EViTOH) in the newly established Infectious Disease and Oncology Research Institute (IDORI) at the University of the Witwatersrand in April 2024. Since 2020, Venter has been the vice president of the World Society for Virology responsible for Africa and President-elect since 2024.

== Memberships ==
Venter is a member of various scientific organizations and societies including the Academy of Science of South Africa (ASSAf), the World Society for Virology(WSV), and the Federation of Infectious Diseases Societies of Southern Africa (FIDSSA) where she co-leads the Virology group and in the process of establishing this to the Southern Africa Virology Society. She is also a member of the National Genomic Surveillance South Africa group (NGS-SA) that described various COVID-19 variants during the pandemic including Omicron. She is on the Global One Health Community scientific advisory board and chairs the organizing committee for the 8th World One Health Congress (WOHC) that will be held in South Africa in September 2024.

== Recognitions ==
In 2013, Venter won the National Science and Technology Forum (NSTF) award for the best output by a senior scientist within the previous 5 to 10 years in South Africa.

== Publications ==
- Google Scholar Marietjie Venter
- Researchgate/Marietjie Venter
- Marietjie Venter- ORCID
