= Peter Salama =

Australian epidemiologist (1968–2020)

Peter Salama (1968 – 23 January 2020) was an Australian epidemiologist who worked for UNICEF (2002–16) and the World Health Organization (2016–19). He was particularly known for his work at both organisations managing their responses to Ebola epidemics in Africa. Richard Horton, editor of The Lancet, described him as "a loyal and committed health advocate and multilateralist" who "brought depth and strength to WHO".

== Biography ==
Salama gained his medical degree from the University of Melbourne and a degree in public health from Harvard University.

His early career included positions at Tufts University and at the U.S. Centers for Disease Control and Prevention, from which he was seconded to the UN High Commissioner for Refugees after the September 11 attacks. He also worked in Asia and Africa for the charities Médecins Sans Frontières and Concern Worldwide. In 2002, Salama started to work for UNICEF as Chief of Health and Nutrition in Afghanistan (2002–04), where he was credited by the former public health minister, Suraya Dalil, as facilitating the establishment of a fair system of health care in the country. He then served as the agency's Chief of Global Health and Principal Advisor on HIV/AIDS, New York (2004–09) and Ethiopia and Zimbabwe representative (2009–15). In 2015, he was appointed UNICEF's Regional Director for the Middle East and North Africa, based in Jordan. In this role, he managed the agency's international work on Ebola, and also oversaw programmes in Syria, Iraq and Yemen.

In 2016, he joined the World Health Organization (WHO) in a newly created position as head of their Health Emergencies Programme. He led the agency's work during the end of the West African Ebola epidemic, and the subsequent Ebola outbreak in Équateur province, Democratic Republic of the Congo (2018), as well as the epidemic centred on Kivu province (2018–20). He was appointed head of WHO's Universal Health Coverage in March 2019, a position that he held until his death. Other responsibilities included board membership of GAVI (from 2019) and the Partnership for Maternal, Newborn & Child Health.

His published research was in the areas of HIV, infectious diseases for which there are vaccines, nutrition, mother and child health, and health issues relating to war, refugees and emergencies.

Salama was married; he and his wife had three sons. He died from a heart attack on 23 January 2020 in Geneva, Switzerland, at the age of 51.

== Selected publications ==
Reviews

- Tessa Wardlaw; Peter Salama; Clarissa Brocklehurst; Mickey Chopra; Elizabeth Mason (2010), "Diarrhoea: why children are still dying and what can be done", The Lancet, 375 (9718): 870–72, doi:10.1016/S0140-6736(09)61798-0, PMID 19833382, S2CID 29645246
- Tessa Wardlaw; Peter Salama; Emily White Johansson; Elizabeth Mason (2006), "Pneumonia: the leading killer of children", The Lancet, 368 (9541): 1048–1050, doi:10.1016/S0140-6736(06)69334-3, PMID 16997649, S2CID 37807021
- Peter Salama; Paul Spiegel; Leisel Talley; Ronald Waldman (2004), "Lessons learned from complex emergencies over past decade", The Lancet, 364 (9447): 1801–13, doi:10.1016/S0140-6736(04)17405-9, PMID 15541455, S2CID 22068634
- R. F. Mollica; B. Lopes Cardozo; H. J. Osofsky; B. Raphael; A. Ager; P. Salama (2004), "Mental health in complex emergencies", The Lancet, 364 (9450): 2058–67, doi:10.1016/S0140-6736(04)17519-3, PMID 15582064, S2CID 6134818

Research papers

- Edmore Marinda; Jean H. Humphrey; Peter J. Iliff; Kuda Mutasa; Kusum J. Nathoo; Ellen G. Piwoz; Lawrence H. Moulton; Peter Salama; Brian J. Ward; et al. (ZVITAMBO Study Group) (2007), "Child mortality according to maternal and infant HIV status in Zimbabwe", The Pediatric Infectious Disease Journal, 26 (6): 519–26, doi:10.1097/01.inf.0000264527.69954.4c, PMID 17529870, S2CID 10535639
