= Safe Hands Challenge =

Campaign launched by the World Health Organization

- Date: March 13, 2020
- Type: Campaign
- Cause: Urges everyone to wash their hands regularly for 40 seconds
- Organised by: World Health Organization

Safe Hands Challenge is a campaign launched by the World Health Organization (WHO) in the wake of COVID-19 pandemic. It was launched on 13 March 2020 by Tedros Adhanom Ghebreyesus, the Director of the WHO. The campaign urges everyone to wash their hands regularly for 40 seconds to keep themselves safe and prevent the transmission of disease. The WHO has called on celebrities from around the world, such as Leonardo DiCaprio and Greta Thunberg, to participate in the Safe Hands Challenge.

== Response ==
Within 48 hours of its launch, 'The Safe Hands Challenge' was used as a TikTok hashtag nearly half a billion times. Celebrities including the Pussycat Dolls, Billy Porter, Deepika Padukone, Sachin Tendulkar have shared videos of themselves promoting hand hygiene as a part of the Safe Hands Challenge.
