= Intervirology =

- Discipline: Virology
- Language: English
- Edited by: Jean-Claude Manuguerra

Publication details
- Former name: Journal of the Virology Division of the International Union of Microbiological Societies
- History: 1973–present
- Publisher: Karger Publishers
- Frequency: Bimonthly
- Open access: Hybrid
- Impact factor: 1.773 (2013)

Standard abbreviations
- ISO 4: Intervirology

Indexing
- ISSN: 0300-5526 (print); 1423-0100 (web)
- OCLC no.: 1788734

Links
- Journal homepage

Intervirology is a bimonthly peer-reviewed medical journal covering all aspects of virology, especially concerning animal viruses. It was established in 1973 and is published by Karger Publishers. The editor-in-chief is Jean-Claude Manuguerra.

== History ==
The journal was established in 1973 by J.L. Melnick as the Journal of the Virology Division of the International Union of Microbiological Societies. In 1982, it published a paper providing the first taxonomic description of the Ebola virus into the Filoviridae.

== Abstracting and indexing ==
Intervirology is abstracted and indexed in

- MEDLINE/PubMed
- Science Citation Index Expanded
- Excerpta Medica
- Chemical Abstracts
- Biological Abstracts
- Scopus
- Current Contents

According to the Journal Citation Reports, the journal has a 2013 impact factor of 1.773.
