= Peter Ben Embarek =

Food safety scientist of World Health Organization

Peter K. Ben Embarek
- Education: PhD, Royal Veterinary and Agricultural University
- Scientific career
- Fields: food safety and nutrition
- Institutions: program manager, WHO; fellow, IUFoST

Peter Karim Ben Embarek is a Danish food scientist and former program manager at World Health Organization (WHO) specializing in food safety and zoonoses.

== Early life and education ==
Ben Embarek graduated with a master of science in food science and technology and a doctorate in food safety from the Royal Veterinary and Agricultural University in Copenhagen.

== Career ==
Peter Ben Embarek joined the World Health Organization at its Geneva headquarters in 2001. He worked at WHO's China Office and advised the Chinese government on food safety and nutrition issues. Between 2014 and 2017, he managed WHO's MERS-CoV virus Task Force and coordinated the investigation into the animal source of the virus. He is the WHO's top expert on zoonotic diseases. In 2020, he was appointed mission head of the 13 member team of the World Health Organization's investigation into the origins of COVID-19.

On 9 February 2021, at the conclusion of his investigation, Ben Embarek said it was "extremely unlikely" that the virus leaked from a lab in Wuhan; Ben Embarak later noted that Chinese officials pressured him to include this phrase in the report. In a Danish documentary aired on August 12, 2021, Ben Embarak stated: "A lab employee infected in the field while collecting samples in a bat cave — such a scenario belongs both as a lab-leak hypothesis and as our first hypothesis of direct infection from bat to human. We’ve seen that hypothesis as a likely hypothesis".

== Awards ==
Ben Embarek is a fellow of the International Academy of Food Science and Technology under the International Union of Food Science and Technology. He is also the recipient of the 2017 Scientific Spirit Award of the Chinese Institute of Food Science and Technology.

== Controversies ==
In 2023, Ben Embarek was fired from WHO for sexual misconduct after allegations received in 2015 and 2017. Ben Embarek said there was still an “ongoing procedure” and that he had challenged the WHO sanction, which was “not final”. He added an incident in 2017 was amicably settled. Ben Embarek said he was unaware of any other complaints and denied harassment.
