= Scientific Advisory Group for the Origins of Novel Pathogens =

WHO advisory group

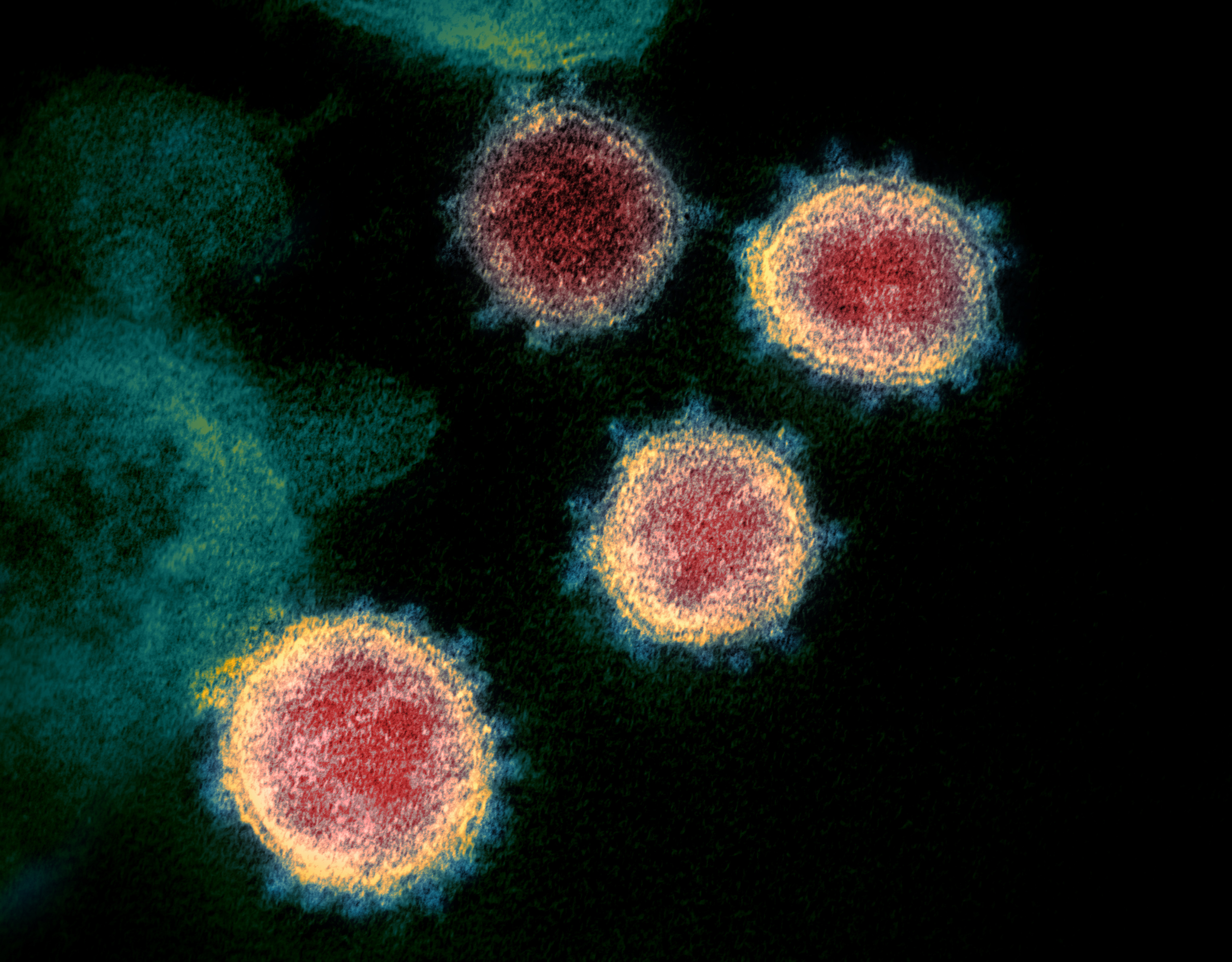
Novel Coronavirus SARS-CoV-2 (electron microscope image)

Scientific Advisory Group for the Origins of Novel Pathogens (or SAGO) is a permanent advisory body of the World Health Organization, formed in July 2021, with a broad objective to examine emerging infectious diseases, including COVID-19. According to the WHO Director-General, "SAGO will play a vital role in the next phase of studies into the origins of SARS-CoV-2, as well as the origins of future new pathogens." The group was formed after the WHO-convened Global Study of Origins of SARS-CoV-2 was disbanded by the WHO. In February 2022, the WHO Director General visited China and met the Chinese premier and discussed the need for "stronger collaboration on Covid-19 virus origins, rooted in science and evidence". In July 2023, a review article in The New York Times details information to date about the origins of the Covid-19 virus.

== Background ==
=== Formation ===
The WHO first announced its decision to create SAGO in July 2021, following the WHO-convened Global Study of Origins of SARS-CoV-2, which countries including the United States, Japan and Australia reportedly said was "compromised by a lack of transparency from China". The WHO-convened report finding that a laboratory incident was "extremely unlikely" was reportedly also pushed back on by WHO Director-General Tedros Adhanom who called on China to share raw data, be transparent, and cooperate for the next phase of the study. Critics of the WHO convened study group said it was hampered by conflict of interest, as one member had a long-standing working relationship with the Wuhan Institute of Virology. The Chinese government responded stating the WHO-China joint mission report was "authoritative, science-based & widely recognized" and urged "relevant parties to stop politicizing the issue of origin-tracing."

The technical lead of the WHO's COVID-19 response Maria Van Kerkhove told the Washington Post in October 2021 that the new SAGO group, which includes scientists from the United States and China, is "a real opportunity right now to get rid of all the noise, all the politics surrounding this and focus on what we know". However, Lawrence Gostin of the Georgetown University Law Center, who specializes in public health law, said to the WaPo "If you believe that SAGO will answer the question, what was the origin of SARS-CoV-2, then you are sadly mistaken because there is little to no chance of them gaining access to information or on-the-ground investigation as far as China is concerned". Van Kerkhove said that a mission to a member state needs to be arranged and is hopeful that "there will be additional missions to China and potentially elsewhere". Gostin said the biggest value of the group would be not for COVID-19, but for the WHO to have an expert standing committee rigorously vetted to investigate future outbreaks where conflicts arise. In July 2023, a review article in The New York Times details information to date about the origins of the Covid-19 virus.

=== Panel Membership ===
On October 13, 2021, the WHO issued a "public notice" listing 26 "proposed members" for the group, offering the public to provide "public comments" on the individuals selected.

During the public comments period, several scientists including Alina Chan said that several individuals proposed members may carry biases, and that no members from the WHO-convened study team should have been selected for SAGO.

On November 1, 2021, the WHO announced it would re-open the call for applications for an additional three days to encourage more applications from experts in the social sciences fields of anthropology, ethics, political science and the fields of biosafety and biosecurity.

On November 24, the group held its first meeting with 27 members, chaired by medical virologist Marietjie Venter, from the University of Pretoria (South Africa), with Jean-Claude Manuguerra, from Institut Pasteur (France), as vice-chairman, and two new members from social sciences and biosecurity fields. The meeting was largely procedural, and members agreed to meet frequently to form an overarching framework to study emerging novel pathogens, including the origins of COVID-19.

== Reports and publications ==
On 9 June 2022, SAGO published its first preliminary report, outlining recommendations for a global framework for investigating emerging pathogens and further studies into the origins of SARS-CoV-2. It identified gaps in the available evidence and recommended additional human, animal, environmental and laboratory-related investigations. The report described its findings as preliminary and did not reach a conclusive determination of the origins of the pandemic.

In September 2024, WHO published a global framework developed with SAGO to guide investigations into the origins of emerging and re-emerging pathogens. It covers early outbreak investigations, human studies, animal and environmental studies, genomic analysis, and biosafety and biosecurity investigations. The framework was republished on 11 February 2025 following editorial changes, without technical changes.

On 27 June 2025, SAGO published its Independent assessment of the origins of SARS-CoV-2. The report concluded that the available scientific evidence best supported zoonotic transmission, either directly from bats or through an intermediate host, but did not establish conclusively when, where or how the virus first entered the human population. SAGO stated that information needed to assess a possible laboratory-related incident had not been provided, preventing it from confirming or excluding that possibility. It called for further sharing of data relevant to the competing hypotheses.

== Criticism ==
Several scientists criticised the formation of SAGO's panel for lacking certain areas of expertise.

== See also ==
- COVID-19 lab leak theory
- Investigations into the origin of COVID-19
