= Taiwan and the World Health Organization =

Taiwan and the WHO

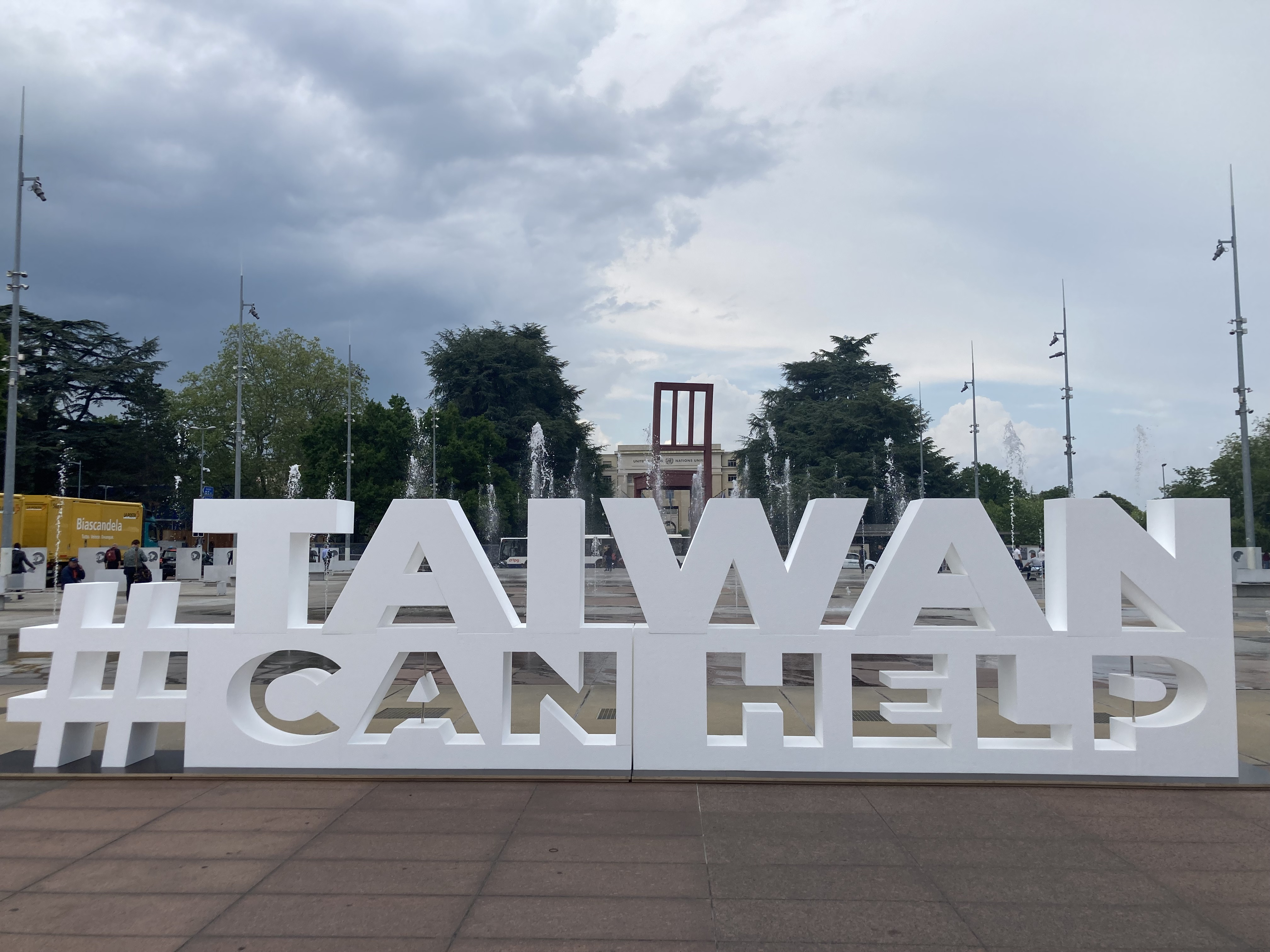
"#TaiwanCanHelp" installation art displayed in front of the Palace of Nations in Geneva during the 2023 World Health Assembly

Taiwan and the World Health Organization (WHO) have a complicated history due to their relationship with China.

== History ==
Chiang Kai-Shek's Republic of China (ROC) government was one of the founding members of WHO in 1948. After the ROC retreated to Taiwan, it maintained its WHO membership for more than two decades. In 1972, however, the World Health Assembly (WHA), which governs the WHO, voted to recognise the People's Republic of China (PRC) instead, in alignment with the broader shift in the UN at the time.

From 2009 to 2016, Taiwan participated under "Chinese Taipei" in a limited capacity in the World Health Assembly. The WHA allows non-state observers whereas the WHO requires its members to have statehood. Foreign policy concerns influenced the process preceding and during Taiwan's participation. China blocked any forms of engagement that could undermine its claim as the sole government of both the mainland and Taiwan. This was less of an issue under Taiwan's Kuomintang party, which tacitly recognises the "one China" principle. The Democratic Progressive Party, on the other hand, desires to link WHA observer status with full WHO membership and found participation as a Chinese delegation unacceptable. Nonetheless, Taiwan has made at least some progress in health-related forums compared to its impasse in other UN-affiliated agencies. Taiwan has been excluded since 2016.

On December 31, 2019, Taiwan's government expressed concerns to the WHO about the Coronavirus's potential for human-to-human transmission, but received no response. The WHO instead endorsed China's denial of human-to-human transmission until January 21, when China confirmed it. Having experienced the 2002–2004 SARS outbreak, Taiwan immediately adopted vigorous measures for screening, testing, contact tracing, and enforcing quarantines, in what was widely considered a successful pandemic response. This version of events was promoted by U.S. President Donald Trump to discredit China, the WHO, and deepen ties with Taiwan. A subsequent investigation by the Guardian pointed out, however, that Taiwan's communications with the WHO never explicitly mentioned human-to-human transmission and contained the same information as a previous announcement from the health authorities in Wuhan, China. While the WHO on January 14 cited China's statement of "no clear evidence" of human-to-human transmission, it held a broad range of views during that time period. For example, on January 10, 11, and 14, it advised the government and healthcare officials of all countries to be on the look out for human transmission, which was described as a possibility, and to consider quarantining patients.

Due to Taiwan's successful response to the COVID-19 pandemic, its inclusion in the WHO gained international attention in 2020, with strong support from the United States, Japan, Germany and Australia. In February 2020, Taiwan became more vocal about its exclusion from World Health Organization meetings.

In an April 2020 interview, Assistant Director-General Bruce Aylward appeared to dodge a question from RTHK reporter Yvonne Tong about Taiwan's response to the pandemic and inclusion in the WHO, saying he couldn't hear her and asking to move to another question. When the video chat was restarted, he was asked another question about Taiwan. He responded by indicating that they had already discussed China and formally ended the interview. The incident led to accusations about the PRC's political influence over the international organization. In May 2020, Taiwan rejected China's main condition for it to be able to participate at the WHO, which was to accept that it was part of China.

In May 2023, two reporters from Taiwan's Central News Agency were denied access to the World Health Assembly. The exclusion of Taiwanese journalists was criticized by international journalist organizations and the Taiwanese government.

== See also ==
- Health in Taiwan
- China and the United Nations
- Political status of Taiwan
