= Health Emergencies Programme (WHO) =

The World Health Organization Health Emergencies Programme was established on 1 July 2016 by Director-General Margaret Chan at the request of the World Health Assembly.

== History ==
Due to the slow response to the 2014-2015 Ebola virus epidemic in West Africa, DG Chan sought the help of an all-star Advisory Group on Reform of WHO's Work in Outbreaks and Emergencies with Health and Humanitarian Consequences. The Advisory Group was composed of 19 members "with relevant experience, including senior leadership positions in United Nations agencies, government and international humanitarian non-governmental organizations." The Advisory Group was chaired by David Nabarro. For continuity, two of its members were on the subsequently-established first IAOC. The Advisory Group's final report was on the DG's desk in time for the April 2016 meeting of the WHA.

WHO budgeted an additional $494 million for this programme in the first year of its operation, for which it had received $140 million by April 2016.

== Executive Director ==
In 2019, Michael J. Ryan became Executive Director of the WHOHEP, replacing Peter Salama in an internal reshuffle.

=== Independent Oversight and Advisory Committee ===
The Advisory Group issued a final report from which was drawn the Term of Reference document, which the WHA agreed would be the guidance to DGWHO in the formation of the HEP. The HEP has been formed with an "Independent Oversight and Advisory Committee" (IAOC) as supervisor and in order "to provide oversight and monitoring of the development and performance of the Programme and to guide the Programme’s activities". The IAOC is a volunteer board and members are only reimbursed with a travel and per-diem entitlement.

The IAOC consists of seven or eight members "drawn from national governments, nongovernmental organizations, and the UN system, with extensive experience in broad range of disciplines, including public health, infectious disease, humanitarian crises, public administration, emergency management, community engagement, partnerships and development. Members serve in their personal capacity..."

=== IAOC membership ===
As of April 2020, the IAOC had as its seven members:

- Felicity Harvey (Chair)
- Walid Ammar
- Hiroyoshi Endo
- Geeta Rao Gupta
- Jeremy M. Konyndyk
- Malebona Precious Matsoso
- Theresa Tam

=== Past IAOC members ===
As of April 2016 and April 2017 and October 2017 the IAOC was composed of eight members:

- Precious Matsoso (Chair); Director General of Health, South Africa
- Walid Ammar; Director General of Health, Lebanon
- Geeta Rao Gupta; Deputy Executive Director, UNICEF
- Felicity Harvey; Director General for Public and International Health, UK
- Jeremy Konyndyk; Director, Office of US Foreign Disaster Assistance, USAID
- Hiroki Nakatani; Special Assistant for International Affairs, Minister of Health, Labour and Welfare, Japan
- Michael J. Ryan; Senior Advisor, Global Polio Eradication Initiative, National Emergency Operations Centre, Islamabad, Pakistan
- Elhadj As Sy; Secretary General, International Federation of Red Cross and Red Crescent Societies

Michael Ryan departed the IAOC in May 2017 and was listed as member until at least April 2018. By June 2018, the list of IOAC members had assumed its April 2020 form.
