= Global Outbreak Alert and Response Network =

Network of technical and public health institutions

The Global Outbreak Alert and Response Network (GOARN) is a network composed of numerous technical and public health institutions, laboratories, NGOs, and other organizations that work to observe and respond to threatening epidemics. GOARN works closely with and under the World Health Organization (WHO), which is one of its most notable partners. Its goals are to: examine and study diseases, evaluate the risks that certain diseases pose, and improve international capability to deal with diseases.

== Creation ==
The World Health Organization realized at the start of the 21st century that it did not have the resources required to adequately respond to and prevent epidemics around the world. Thus, a "Framework for Global Outbreak and Response" was created by the Department of Communicable Diseases Surveillance and Response, and Regional Offices. This framework was put then forth in a meeting in Geneva from April 26–28, 2000. In this meeting, which was attended by 121 representatives from 67 institutions, the decision was made to form GOARN to contribute resources, coordination, surveillance, and technical assistance towards combating diseases.

It was decided that GOARN would be directed by a steering committee made of 20 representatives of GOARN partners and an operational support team (OST) based in WHO. The steering committee oversees and plans the activities of GOARN, and the OST is composed of a minimum of 5–6 WHO staff. Task forces and groups were established to deal with specific issues. GOARN resources are primarily coordinated by the World Health Organization.

== Goals ==
The WHO's guiding principles are to standardize "epidemiological, laboratory, clinical management, research, communication, logistics, support, security, evacuation, and communication systems" and coordinative international resources to support local efforts by GOARN partners to combat outbreaks. It also focuses on improving long term ability to provide technical assistance to affected areas.

== Partners ==
GOARN has grown to now have over 600 partners in the form of public health institutions, networks, laboratories, and United Nations and non-governmental organizations. Technical institutions, networks, and organizations that have the ability to improve GOARN's capabilities are eligible for partnership. Through its partners, GOARN is staffed by a variety of individuals who specialize in public health, such as "doctors, nurses, infection control specialists, logisticians, laboratory specialists; communication, anthropology and social mobilization experts, emergency management and public health professionals among others."

As its biggest partner, WHO plays a large role in GOARN. Alongside coordinating its resources to combat outbreaks, WHO provides much of the staffing and assistance for GOARN, though as will be covered later, does not fund GOARN directly. Since the network is primarily led by the WHO, there is some uncertainty as to whether WHO should be considered a partner in GOARN or if the network should be considered a WHO initiative.

Another notable partner is the Centers for Disease Control, which sends technical resources and staff to GOARN. The CDC also has a history of resource sharing and cooperation with WHO in order to combat disease.

== Budget ==
The WHO does not directly fund GOARN. Instead, GOARN members and outside fundraising that is carried out each time there is a new incidence is used to support the GOARN response. The Nuclear Threat Initiative provides GOARN with US$500,000 as a revolving fund, meant to be used for quickly mobilizing response teams. This is known as the WHO-NTI Global Emergency Response Fund, and must be repaid after withdrawal. The GOARN is effective at operating from a fairly small budget.

== Field missions ==
GOARN has responded to over 120 occurrences in 85 countries and has deployed over 2,300 experts into the field. Some examples of deployments are the SARS outbreak in Asia in 2003, Rift Valley fever, and the nipah virus around the Indian subcontinent.

=== Field missions overview ===
Since its creation, GOARN cooperated with various other organizations to control outbreaks and improve national capacity to respond to diseases. A brief history of GOARN's work against international diseases is as follows. In 2000–2003, GOARN primarily responded to outbreaks of diseases such as cholera, meningitis, and yellow fever in Africa. It supported field investigation and outbreak containment. In 2003, GOARN helped to deploy international teams and helped to coordinate the response against SARS. In 2004, the network was one of the first to deploy against H5N1 influenza. In April–July 2005, GOARN helped to control Marburg Hemorrhagic fever in Angola. It carried out some "risk assessment and preparedness missions" in 2006, along with some response to human bird flu. In 2008/2009, GOARN responded to cholera in Zimbabwe.

=== GOARN and SARS ===
GOARN played a role in containing the 2003 SARS outbreak in Asia. The network sent teams of experts in epidemiology, microbiology/virology, and infection control to Hanoi, Vietnam on March 14, 2003 and then Beijing China on March 25, 2003. GOARN assisted during this outbreak to not only study the outbreak and provide assistance, but also facilitate communication between the Department of Health (Hong Kong) and the WHO.

Earliest signs of the outbreak in China were reported February 11–24, when multiple people were reported to contract the disease. WHO was notified February 28 and then directly notified GOARN March 13. The first members of a WHO/GOARN outbreak control team arrived in Hong Kong March 14, followed by another 5-person GOARN team 12 days later. This second team transitioned to Guangdong, where they investigated the earliest cases of SARS and conducted interviews with health staff. The outbreak was declared by WHO to be contained by July 5.

Worldwide, GOARN carried out many of the operations for the initial response to SARS through the mobilization of field teams. Also through GOARN, the WHO developed many international networks to create tools and standards for containing the epidemic. These networks communicated data by teleconference and use of secure websites for sharing of information.

Besides these networks and field teams, GOARN also assisted nations by directly providing assistance to affected areas and improving their capacity to respond to such threats in the future. GOARN's role in the outbreak was recognized by the World Health Assembly during the 56th Assembly in resolution WHA56.29.

=== GOARN and Ebola ===
On March 23, 2014, the first reports of Ebola in Guinea were reported by WHO's Regional Office in Africa. Five days later, the first GOARN team was sent to Guinea. This team found the situation to be quite severe and its findings were discussed in a press conference in Geneva April 8.

In the third week of April, WHO collaborated with GOARN to send a new medical team trained in infection prevention/control and intensive care to Guinea's principal hospital, Donka Hospital. Two weeks later, on May 5, WHO deployed experts, thirty three of whom were from GOARN, to West Africa to assist in the response to the outbreak. The outbreak was detected to have spread to Sierre Leone later in the month.

On June 23, a GOARN steering committee session sent a message to WHO requesting for WHO to lead the response more strongly because it was the only agency with the resources and staff to do so.

Over the course of the outbreak, the network deployed 895 experts, including "doctors, nurses, infection control specialists, logisticians, laboratory specialists; communication, anthropology and social mobilisation experts, emergency management and public health professionals." The network is still involved in the response to Ebola.

=== GOARN and cholera ===
In response to a 2012 cholera outbreak in Sierra Leone, GOARN sent case management and laboratory experts from the International Centre for Diarrhoeal Disease Research, Bangladesh to help train health care and laboratory workers.

In Northern Iraq, the Syrian Civil War displaced many refugees into the Kurdistan. The refugee camps suffer from poor sanitation, which has led to cholera outbreaks in the region in 2007 and 2012. GOARN, as per the request of the Ministry of Health of Iraq for support and training in outbreak response, deployed a multidisciplinary team of six experts to the North-Iraqi Dohuk and Erbil camps to assist with assessing the risk of cholera and other diseases as well as assisting MoH to prepare for response to the diseases.

=== GOARN and H1N1 ===
GOARN supported countries and various other outbreak control organizations to fight against the H1N1 outbreak in the US and Mexico. The GOARN alert and request for assistance started in Mexico April 24, 2009. Over the course of the outbreak, GOARN helped the Pan American Health Organization coordinate and exchange information with the CDC and Public Health Agency of Canada. It was provided with support and training from the Regional Office for the Western Pacific Response so that it could support regional offices in Manila and carry out field missions in Malaysia and Mongolia. The network carried out a joint training course with the Regional Office for the Eastern Mediterranean in Cairo.

All in all, GOARN carried out 188 missions to 27 countries to strengthen international coordination between these organizations and to improve international capacity to respond to threats. Its activities consisted of assessment of the situation, communication between partners, infection control, laboratory diagnostic, and transportation of specimens.

== See also ==
- Nuclear Threat Initiative – Initiative which GOARN borrows funds from when there is need to quickly mobilize field teams.
- World Health Organization – Organization that is a major partner and coordinator of GOARN.
