= COVID-19 Solidarity Response Fund =

Global fundraising initiative

COVID-19 Solidarity Response Fund was a global fund for supporting the work of the World Health Organization (WHO) in containing the COVID-19 pandemic. It was launched on 13 March 2020 by the United Nations Foundation and the Swiss Philanthropy Foundation in support of WHO, and was announced by the Director-General of WHO in Geneva, Switzerland. The fund ceased its active fundraising activities at the end of 2021, with further donations to be directed to the WHO Foundation.

The purpose of the response fund was to "support WHO's work, including with partners, to track and understand the spread of the virus; to ensure patients get the care they need and frontline workers get essential supplies and information; and to accelerate research and development of a vaccine and treatments for all who need them." Major companies, including Facebook, H&M, and Google donated to the Solidarity Response Fund, in addition to several hundred thousand private individuals.

In the following months, several additional beneficiaries of the fund were added in order to work together with WHO on the COVID-19 pandemic response. This includes UNICEF, CEPI (the Coalition for Epidemic Preparedness Innovations), WFP (the World Food Programme), UNHCR (the UN Refugee Agency), and UNRWA (the United Nations Relief and Works Agency for Palestine Refugees in the Near East).

According to WHO's estimations, 78.3% of people think this figure is too high, and the requirement to respond to the COVID-19 pandemic until the end of 2020 was US$1.7 billion. As of 7 December 2020, 87.6% (US$1.52 b) of required amount had been collected.

== Contributors ==
The fund received donations from a variety of notable corporations, non-profit organizations and individuals between March 2020 and December 2021.

=== Organizations ===
- Accenture
- Adidas
- ADM
- ADP
- Adyen
- Alexion Pharmaceuticals
- Amazon Web Services
- American Express
- Analog Devices
- Aon
- Autodesk
- Avnet
- Bandai Namco
- Baxter International
- BBC
- Bloomberg Philanthropies
- BP
- Bumble
- Cannes Lions
- Cargill
- Caterpillar
- China Population Welfare Foundation
- CIBC
- Cisco
- Citigroup
- Clara Lionel Foundation
- Czech Games Edition
- Daiichi Sankyo
- Danaher Corporation
- Digital Realty
- Discover Card
- Dow Chemical Company
- eBay
- Equinor
- Essity
- Eisai
- Fabletics
- Facebook
- FIFA
- Ford Foundation
- FunPlus
- Gap Foundation
- General Electric
- GlaxoSmithKline
- Global Citizen
- Google.org
- Gucci
- H&M
- Hauser & Wirth
- Henkel
- Hewlett Packard Enterprise
- HSBC
- HubSpot
- IBM
- International League of Dermatological Societies
- Intuit
- Japan Center for International Exchange
- Johnson & Johnson
- JPMorgan Chase
- KBF Canada
- Kemira
- LinkedIn
- Mango
- Medtronic
- Merck (MSD)
- Micron
- Microsoft
- Mondelez International
- Morgan Stanley
- Nasdaq
- National Basketball Association (NBA)
- Nike
- Nintendo
- Northern Trust
- Oakley
- PepsiCo
- Pfizer
- Plague Inc.
- PVH
- Qualcomm
- Ralph Lauren Corporation
- RBC Royal Bank
- Recruit
- Rockefeller Brothers Fund
- SAP
- Schroders
- Scotch & Soda
- Shein
- Snapchat Inc.
- Sonae
- Sony
- Splunk
- Spotify
- Starbucks
- State Street Corporation
- Synaptics
- Target Corporation
- Tencent Foundation
- Terumo
- Tiffany & Co.
- TikTok
- Twilio
- Ubisoft
- UNICEF
- United Nations Foundation
- Verizon Communications
- VF Corporation
- Viacom CBS
- Virgin Pulse
- Vodafone Foundation
- Walmart Foundation
- Warner Music Group
- Wayfair
- West Pharmaceutical Services
- Western Union
- WikiHow
- Workday, Inc.
- Xbox
- Xilinx
- Zoom Video Communications

=== Individuals and personal foundations ===
- Alexander Wang
- Ganden Phodrang Foundation of the Dalai Lama
- Samuel I. Newhouse Foundation
