= UN COVID-19 Supply Chain Task Force =

Healthcare coordination by United Nations

The UN COVID-19 Supply Task Force is a task force set up by the United Nations to coordinate the procurement and distribution of personal protective equipment, diagnostic tests and oxygen to countries with overstretched healthcare systems. This initiative will be run by the World Health Organization and the World Food Programme, along with the multiple partners of United Nations. The hubs of this supply chain system will be located in China, Belgium, Ethiopia, Panama, Malaysia, Ghana, South Africa and the United Arab Emirates. According to the WHO, the supply chain may need to cover more than 30% of the world's needs in the acute phase of the pandemic. WHO announced that the World Food Programme will need to deploy eight 747 aircraft, eight medium-sized cargo aircraft and several smaller passenger planes to move the equipment and staff.
