= Daniel Garrison Brinton =

American ethnologist (1837–1899)

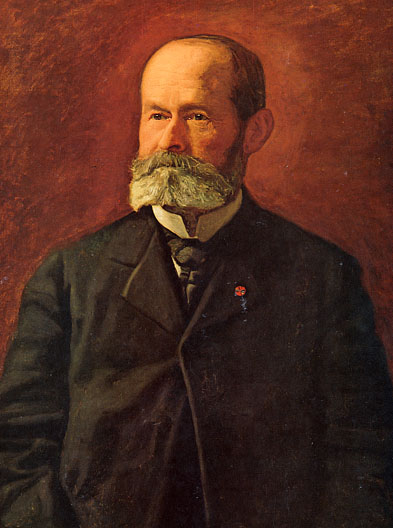
- Brinton wearing the rosette of the Military Order of the Loyal Legion of the United States (portrait by Thomas Eakins, c. 1899)
- Born: May 13, 1837; Thornbury Township, Pennsylvania, U.S.
- Died: July 31, 1899 (aged 62); Philadelphia, Pennsylvania, U.S.

Academic background
- Education: Yale University; Jefferson Medical College

Academic work
- Discipline: Native American linguistics; Native American ethnology
- Military career
- Allegiance: United States
- Branch: Union Army
- Service years: 1862–1865
- Conflicts: American Civil War; Chattanooga campaign; Battle of Missionary Ridge

Daniel Garrison Brinton (May 13, 1837 – July 31, 1899) was an American archeologist, ethnologist, and surgeon.

== Biography ==
Brinton was born in Thornbury Township, Chester County, Pennsylvania. He graduated from Yale University in 1858 and studied at Jefferson Medical College for two years. He spent the next year traveling in Europe. He continued his studies at Paris and Heidelberg.

From 1862 to 1865, during the American Civil War, he was a surgeon in the Union army, acting during 1864–1865 as surgeon-in-charge of the U.S. Army general hospital at Quincy, Illinois. Brinton was sun-stroked at the Battle of Missionary Ridge and was never again able to travel in very hot weather. This handicap affected his career as an ethnologist.

After the war, Brinton practiced medicine in West Chester, Pennsylvania, for several years; was the editor of a weekly periodical, the Medical and Surgical Reporter, in Philadelphia from 1874 to 1887; became professor of ethnology and archeology in the Academy of Natural Sciences in Philadelphia in 1884; and was professor of American linguistics and archeology in the University of Pennsylvania from 1886 until his death.

He was a member of numerous learned societies in the United States and in Europe and was president at different times of the Numismatic and Antiquarian Society of Philadelphia, of the American Folklore Society, the American Philosophical Society, and of the American Association for the Advancement of Science.

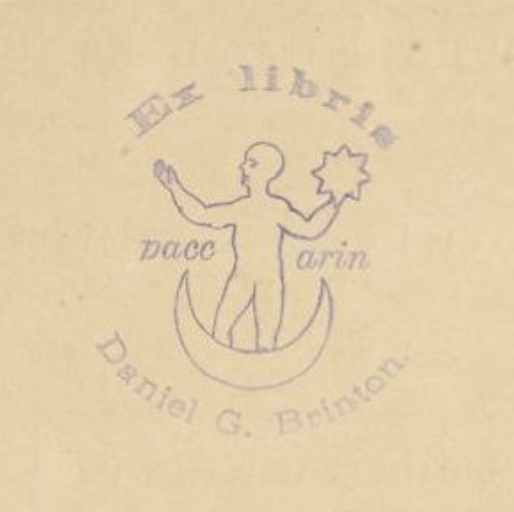
Brinton's ex libris

At his presidential address to the American Association for the Advancement of Science in August 1895, Brinton advocated theories of scientific racism that were pervasive at that time. As Charles A. Lofgren notes in his book, The Plessy Case, although Brinton "accepted the 'psychical unity' throughout the human species," he claimed "all races were 'not equally endowed,' which disqualified [some of] them from the atmosphere of modern enlightenment." He asserted some have "...an inborn tendency, constitutionally recreant to the codes of civilization, and therefore technically criminal." Further, he said the characteristics of "races, nations, tribes...supply the only sure foundations for legislation, not a priori notions of the rights of man."

Brinton was an anarchist during his last several years of life. In April 1896, he addressed the Ethical Fellowship of Philadelphia with a lecture on "What the Anarchists Want," to a friendly audience. In October 1897, Brinton had dinner with Peter Kropotkin after the famous anarchist's only speaking engagement at Philadelphia. Kropotkin had refused invitations from all of the city's elites.

On the occasion of his memorial meeting on October 6, 1900, the keynote speaker Albert H. Smyth stated: "In Europe and America, he sought the society of anarchists and mingled sometimes with the malcontents of the world that he might appreciate their grievances, and weigh their propositions for reform and change."

== Selected works ==
From 1868 to 1899, Brinton wrote many books, and a large number of pamphlets, brochures, addresses and magazine articles. His works include:

- American Hero-Myths: A Study in the Native Religions of the Western Continent.
- Library of Aboriginal American Literature. No. VIII
- Aboriginal American authors and their productions
- Notes on the Floridian Peninsula (1859)
- The Myths of the New World (1868), an attempt to analyze and correlate, scientifically, the mythology of the American Indians
- A Guide-Book of Florida and the South (1869)
- The Religious Sentiment: its Sources and Aim: A Contribution to the Science and Philosophy of Religion (1876)
- American Hero Myths (1882)
- The Annals of the Cakchiquels (1885)
- The Lenâpé and their Legends: With the Complete Text and Symbols of the Walam Olum. self published. 1885.
- The Taensa Grammar and Dictionary: A Deception Exposed. F. H. Revell. 1885. (Exposé of the hoax grammar of the so-called Taensa language.)
- A Lenâpé-English Dictionary. self published. 1889.
- Ancient nahuatl poetry 1890
- Essays of an Americanist (1890)
- Races and Peoples: lectures on the science of ethnography (1890);
- The American Race (1891)
- The Pursuit of Happiness (1893)
- Nagualism, A Study in Native American Folk-lore and History (1894)
- A Primer of Mayan Hieroglyphics, Publications of the University of Pennsylvania. Series in philology, literature and archaeology, vol. 3, no. 2 (1895) (also available at https://archive.org/details/b24873779)
- Religions of Primitive People (1897)

In addition, he edited and published a Library of American Aboriginal Literature (8 vols. 1882–1890), a valuable contribution to the science of anthropology in America. Of the eight volumes; six were edited by Brinton himself, one by Horatio Hale and one by Albert Samuel Gatschet. His 1885 work is notable for its role in the Walam Olum controversy.
