= Health Disparities Center =

Health institutions in the United States

Health Disparities Centers are institutions in the United States that cover a broad range of needs and focus areas to decrease currently disproportionate illness and disease rates that lead to health disparities. They also promote the engagement, empowerment and recruitment of underrepresented populations in health professions. Many programs devote significant resources to developing cultural competency training to promote the delivery of culturally sensitive healthcare by faculty and staff, as well as current and future healthcare providers. These services are usually tailored to meeting specific goals or missions of the individual components common in most of the operating Health Disparities Centers.

== History ==
The Minority Health and Health Disparities Act of 2000, Public Law 106-525 led the way for an innovative program established by the National Center on Minority Health and Health Disparities (NCHMD). This program, originally entitled the Project EXPORT, now bears the title of the NCMHD Centers of Excellence (COE) Program. The mission of this program is to develop centers of research, training, partnership and community outreach in the field and study of health disparities. Through grant support from the NCHMD, these centers contribute to scientific advancements and community programs with the aim of eliminating health disparities. Successful centers are currently operating in 31 states, the District of Columbia, Puerto Rico and the U.S. Virgin Islands. Many of these centers are made in partnerships with research-intensive universities, medical colleges and institutions, historically black colleges and universities, universities that serve Hispanic populations, tribal colleges and liberal arts schools. As of 2007, the NCMHD COE program had supported the development of 37 centers.

Health disparities continue to be major issue in the United States,

== Target populations ==
It is a common misconception that Health Disparities Centers are tailored primarily for minorities, but in actuality their mission extends to a wide range of groups. These include age, gender, ethnicity, geographical location, language barriers, or any other differences related to socioeconomic status or environmental factors. However, the largest disparities are most prominent in minority groups.

According to the Healthy People 2010 Objectives list of ten largest Racial and Ethnic disparities:

- New cases of gonorrhea rank number 1 for Black non-Hispanics
- Congenital syphilis ranks number 1 for Hispanics
- Fetal alcohol syndrome ranks number 1 for American Indian/Alaska Native
- Smoking by pregnant women ranks number 1 for Whites

== Organizational components ==
=== Research component ===
The focus and importance of addressing growing national health disparities represents a relatively new shift in health research. Both the NCMHD Research Endowment Program and the Community-Based Participatory Research Program are initiatives to promote awareness and research incentives for those interested in studying specific health disparities and the effectiveness of current outreach programs. Major research concentrations currently being studied include, but are not limited to, conditions such as HIV/AIDS, obesity, diabetes, specific types of cancers, cardiovascular diseases, and child health promotion. A few examples of specific research studies that have been conducted through a partnership of Health Disparities Centers are as follows:

- "Developing Measures of Parental Knowledge in Physical Activity", a study led by principal investigator Kitty Chan, PhD, was conducted through the Hopkins Center for Health Disparities Solutions. This study examined the parental knowledge of physical activity for health promotion in an effort to increase awareness in target populations where this knowledge may be lacking.
- "Using Community Asset-Mapping in Health Disparities Research" conducted by principal investigator Veronica Parker, Ph.D. and her research team of the EXPORT Center at Clemson University involved a process called asset-mapping, which focused on community health strengths within specific areas serving poor, racial/ethnic minority and rural populations. The mission of this study was to identify these strong resources and engage communities to mobilize, preserve and utilize these faculties.
- Cancer Disparities Research Partnership Program (CDRP) is a Cooperative Planning Grant for Cancer Disparities Research Partnership Program initiated by the National Cancer Institute (NCI). The focus of this program is to plan, develop and conduct research via radiation oncology clinical trials in hospitals serving disproportionately high numbers of patients from populations affected by health disparities.
- The Diabetes Peer Counseling Study, currently underway at the Connecticut Center for Eliminating Health Disparities among Latinos (CEHDL), under the leadership of Rafael Pérez-Escamilla and his co-principal investigators, Grace Damio and Jyoti Chhabra, is a new community-based intervention study. A major aim of their research is to establish a culturally specific diabetes management program that incorporates efforts of community peer-counselors and health professionals through a partnership with the Hispanic Health Council and Hartford Hospital and University of Connecticut.

=== Education and mentoring component ===
As disproportionate burdens of certain diseases and health conditions among specific populations are a growing concern, so is the need for widespread education and training for both the public and health professionals alike to be able to cope with, and prevent the occurrence of growing disparities in their communities. Health Disparities Centers across the nation are active in implementing educational resources that range from undergraduate and graduate coursework, postdoctoral training opportunities, conference or seminar series, and diversity and cultural competency training programs. Additionally, these centers are devoted to the recruitment and retention of research scientists and healthcare practitioners from racial/ethnic minority groups, people with disabilities and socio-economically disadvantaged individuals. Many institutions support faulty mentoring of underrepresented students who are interested in completing community-based participatory research on health disparities.

=== Community outreach component ===
The community outreach component of Health Disparities Centers provides the essential link between advancements in research and implementing significant findings directly into the communities being studied. Emphasis has also been placed on giving target populations affected by health disparities access to health information in a community setting where they feel comfortable to have sensitive health queries addressed. A major goal of Health Disparities Centers is to give the public the knowledge and encouragement necessary to empower them to promote a healthy lifestyle in their homes and communities and be proponents for their own healthcare. Health Disparities Centers also may partner with grassroots and community-based organizations that can serve mediums to disburse educational materials and provide valuable information about the needs of the community to the centers. Examples of successful community outreach programs established by national Health Disparities Centers are provided below.

- Annual Health Fairs provided at Voorhees College for community residents allow attendees to receive health services and information. At these fairs, people can receive free information about nutrition, physical activities and general health-care. They can also receive blood pressure and blood sugar checks and learn about maintaining their body mass index.
- The University of Florida, which is currently developing a new health disparities center, already has held numerous community outreach health and nutrition workshops and recently held its first annual Healthy Vegetable Cook-Off as part of Dr. Carolyn Tucker's Health-Smart Church Program. The event brought women from predominantly African American attended churches together to compete in an effort to create both the most delicious and healthiest vegetable dish.
- The Hopkins Center for Health Disparities Solutions has led the way with its innovative Project LIVE! outreach initiative. Project LIVE! is a collaboration between the center and the web-based organization, Poetology. The joint efforts have produced a compilation CD geared towards raising awareness about health disparities for young African American adults through a familiar medium.

=== Administration component ===
The administration component of numerous Health Disparities Centers is responsible for the oversight and management of all center initiatives and programs and ensures the fiscal responsibility of the institution. It is also common for the governing body of a health disparities center to manage grants and collaborative partnerships between the center and various university, hospital or community entities.

== Social justice implications ==
Health Disparities Centers promote the concept of social justice which is a key facet of sustainability. The process of eliminating health disparities involves breaking language barriers, improving access to health-care, stamping out violence, and alleviating poor health conditions associated with a life of poverty. An example:

- The VCU Center for Health Disparities will be holding "The First International Conference on Culture, Ethnicity, and Brain Injury Rehabilitation." There is a communication problem between survivors and rehabilitation providers who speak different languages. The conference brings together experts from different countries to find an effective plan of action for better communication.

== Environmental justice implications ==
Environment factors contribute to health disparities. Environmental justice refers to the burden that certain groups experience due to the physical environment that encompasses there day-to-day lives. People in different geographical locations may experience health disparities due to pollutants in the food or air, stress factors caused by their physical environment, and availability of different resources. Many health disparity centers have programs to promote a cleaner environment and healthy lifestyles, preventing disparities caused by the environmental. A few examples:

- Center to Reduce Cancer Health Disparities: In 2005, the CRCHD started the Community Networks Program, which "aims to reduce cancer health disparities through community-based participatory education, training, and research among racial/ethnic minorities and underserved populations." The CRCHD will implement this plan through training and educating individuals of communities where a cancer disparity is prevalent. They also plan to provide "evidence-based information" to local, state, and Federal lawmakers to inspire policy changes that reduce cancer disparities.
- Hopkins Center for Health Disparity Solution – The Hopkins center teamed up with Operation Reach Out SouthWest to hold a nutrition workshop. At the workshop, licensed nutritionist provide information on eating healthily by presenting alternative recipes and encouraging portion control.

== List of notable centers supported by the National Institutes of Health ==
(Affiliated Institutions in parentheses)

- Maya Angelou Center for Health Equity (Wake Forest University School of Medicine)
- Hopkins Center for Health Disparities Solutions (Johns Hopkins Bloomberg School of Public Health)
- Center for Health Equity (University of Minnesota)
- Virginia Commonwealth University Center on Health Disparities (Virginia Commonwealth University)
- University of Virginia Health System Center on Health Disparities (University of Virginia)
- UC Davis Center for Reducing Health Disparities (University of California-Davis)
- Center for the Study of Healthcare Disparities & the Odessa Chambliss Wellness Center (Bethune-Cookman University School of Nursing)
- Center to Reduce Cancer Health Disparities (National Cancer Institute)
- Arizona Health Disparities Center
- Brooklyn Center for Health Disparities (Arthur Ashe Institute for Urban Health)
- Iowa Center on Health Disparities (Iowa Center for Immigrant Leadership and Integration, and Cultural Connections)
- KDHE Center for Health Disparities
- Center for the Advancement of Health Disparities Research (University of Washington and the University of Hawaii at Manoa Schools of Nursing)
- Case Center for Reducing Health Disparities (Case Western Reserve University)
- Center of Excellence on Health Disparities (Morehouse School of Medicine)
- The Center for AIDS Health Disparities Research (Morehouse College)
- Center on Native Elder Health Disparities
- Center for the Study of Health Disparities
- Center for Interdisciplinary Health Disparities Research
- Center for Innovation in Health Disparities Research
- Center for the Elimination of Minority Health Disparities (University at Albany, SUNY)
- Center for Eliminating Health Disparities Among Latinos
- The University of Maryland School of Medicine Center for Health Disparities (University of Maryland School of Medicine)
- Center for Health Disparities Research
- Texas Center for Health Disparities
- Hispanic Health Disparities Research Center (University of Texas School of Public Health)
- UTPA South Texas Border Health Disparities Center (Temple University)
- Center for Research on Health Disparities (Clemson University)
- Center For Health Disparities and Molecular Medicine (Loma Linda University)

== See also ==
- Global health
- Health care
- Health equity
- Health promotion
