= Health equity =

Social equity in health

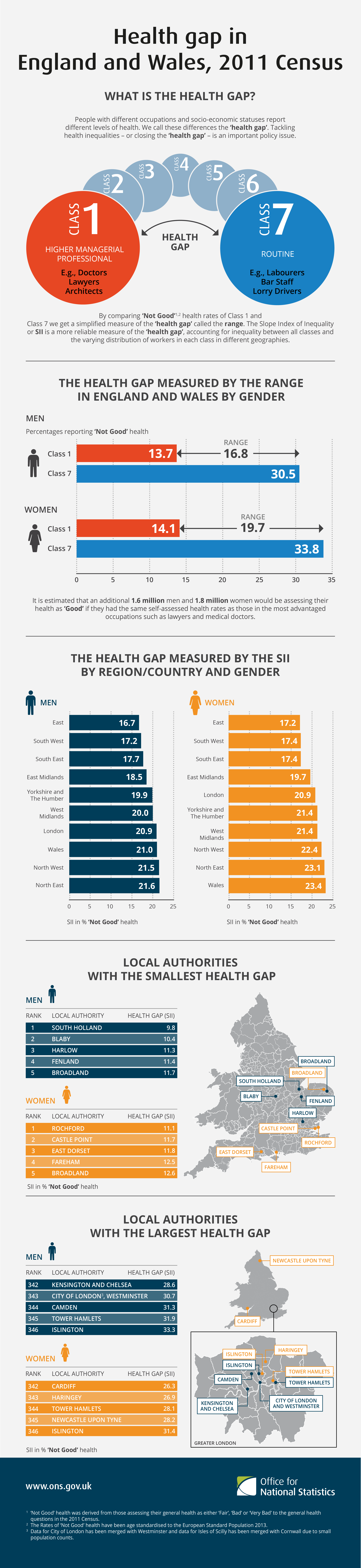
Health gap in England and Wales, 2011 Census

Health equity is social equity in health. Disparities in health outcomes can be related to differences in access to social determinants of health, specifically from wealth, power and prestige. Individuals who have consistently been deprived of these three determinants are significantly disadvantaged from health inequities, and face worse health outcomes than those who are able to access certain resources. This is especially important in areas with increased diversity across social, ethnic, and racial groups, as underrepresentation in healthcare systems is a global issue. In order to achieve health equity, resources must be allocated based on an individual need-based principle.

Health equity is distinct from formal equal opportunity, such as simply providing every individual with equal access to health care. Health equity is also connected with Scientific Equity, which describes the scientific methods by which to achieve Health Equity.

According to the World Health Organization, "Health is a state of complete physical, mental and social well-being and not merely the absence of disease or infirmity". The quality of health and how health is distributed among economic and social status in a society can provide insight into the level of development within that society. Health is a basic human right and human need, and all human rights are interconnected. Thus, health must be discussed along with all other basic human rights.

Health equity is defined by the CDC as "the state in which everyone has a fair and just opportunity to attain their highest level of health". It is closely associated with the social justice movement, with good health considered a fundamental human right. These inequities may include differences in the "presence of disease, health outcomes, or access to health care" between populations with a different race, ethnicity, gender, sexual orientation, disability, or socioeconomic status.

Health inequity differs from health inequality in that the latter term is used in a number of countries to refer to those instances whereby the health of two demographic groups (not necessarily ethnic or racial groups) differs despite similar access to health care services. It can be further described as differences in health that are avoidable, unfair, and unjust, and cannot be explained by natural causes, such as biology, or differences in choice. Thus, if one population dies younger than another because of genetic differences, which is a non-remediable/controllable factor, the situation would be classified as a health inequality. Conversely, if a population has a lower life expectancy due to lack of access to medications, the situation would be classified as a health inequity. These inequities may include differences in the "presence of disease, health outcomes, or access to health care". Although, it is important to recognize the difference in health equity and equality, as having equality in health is essential to begin achieving health equity. The importance of equitable access to healthcare has been cited as crucial to achieving many of the Millennium Development Goals.

== Socioeconomic status ==
Socioeconomic status is both a strong predictor of health, and a key factor underlying health inequities across populations. Poor socioeconomic status has the capacity to profoundly limit the capabilities of an individual or population, manifesting itself through deficiencies in both financial and social capital. It is clear how a lack of financial capital can compromise the capacity to maintain good health. Income is an important determinant of access to healthcare resources. Because one's job or career is a primary conduit for both financial and social capital, work is an important, yet underrepresented, factor in health inequities research and prevention efforts. There are many ways that a job can affect one's health, such as the job's physical demands, exposure to hazards, mechanisms of employment, compensation and benefits, and availability of health and safety programs. In addition, those who are in steady jobs are less likely to face poverty and its implications and more likely to have access to health care. Maintenance of good health through the utilization of proper healthcare resources can be quite costly and therefore unaffordable to certain populations.

In China, for instance, the collapse of the Cooperative Medical System left many of the rural poor uninsured and unable to access the resources necessary to maintain good health. Increases in the cost of medical treatment made healthcare increasingly unaffordable for these populations. This issue was further perpetuated by the rising income inequality in the Chinese population. Poor Chinese were often unable to undergo necessary hospitalization and failed to complete treatment regimens, resulting in poorer health outcomes.

Similarly, in Tanzania, it was demonstrated that wealthier families were far more likely to bring their children to a healthcare provider: a significant step towards stronger healthcare. Unequal income distribution itself can be a cause of poorer health for a society as a result of "underinvestment in social goods, such as public education and health care; disruption of social cohesion and the erosion of social capital".

The role of socioeconomic status in health equity extends beyond simple monetary restrictions on an individual's purchasing power. In fact, social capital plays a significant role in the health of individuals and their communities. It has been shown that those who are better connected to the resources provided by the individuals and communities around them (those with more social capital) live longer lives. The segregation of communities on the basis of income occurs in nations worldwide and has a significant impact on quality of health as a result of a decrease in social capital for those trapped in poor neighborhoods. Social interventions, which seek to improve healthcare by enhancing the social resources of a community, are therefore an effective component of campaigns to improve a community's health.

=== Economic inequality ===
Poor health outcomes appear to be an effect of economic inequality across a population. Nations and regions with greater economic inequality show poorer outcomes in life expectancy, mental health, drug abuse, obesity, educational performance, teenage birthrates, and ill health due to violence. On an international level, there is a positive correlation between developed countries with high economic equality and longevity. Based on where a person lives and how much money they make, experts can predict roughly how long that person will live. According to the World Health Organization (WHO) in 2017, a baby born and raised in Africa will die an average of sixteen years sooner than a child born at the same time in Europe. This is unrelated to average income per capita in wealthy nations. Economic gain only impacts life expectancy to a great degree in countries in which the mean per capita annual income is less than approximately $25,000. The United States shows exceptionally low health outcomes for a developed country, despite having the highest national healthcare expenditure in the world. The US ranks 31st in life expectancy. Americans have a lower life expectancy than their European counterparts, even when factors such as race, income, diet, smoking, and education are controlled for.

Relative inequality negatively affects health on an international, national, and institutional levels. The patterns seen internationally hold true between more and less economically equal states in the United States, that is, more equal states show more desirable health outcomes. Importantly, inequality can have a negative health impact on members of lower echelons of institutions. The Whitehall I and II studies looked at the rates of cardiovascular disease and other health risks in British civil servants and found that, even when lifestyle factors were controlled for, members of lower status in the institution showed increased mortality and morbidity on a sliding downward scale from their higher status counterparts. The negative aspects of inequality are spread across the population. For example, when comparing the United States (a more unequal nation) to England (a less unequal nation), the US shows higher rates of diabetes, hypertension, cancer, lung disease, and heart disease across all income levels. This is also true of the difference between mortality across all occupational classes in highly equal Sweden as compared to less-equal England.

Unconditional cash transfers for reducing poverty used by some programs in the developing world appear to lead to a reduction in the likelihood of being sick. Such evidence can guide resource allocations to effective interventions.

The quality of health care varies among different socioeconomic groups. Children in families of low socioeconomic status are the most susceptible to health inequities. Children in poor families under 5 years of age are likely to face health disparities because the quality of their health depends on others providing for them; young children are not capable of maintaining good health on their own. In addition, these children have higher mortality rates than those in richer families due to malnutrition. Because of their low socioeconomic status, receiving health care can be challenging. Children in poor families are less likely to receive health care in general, and if they do have access to care, it is likely that the quality of that care is not highly sufficient.

=== Education ===
Education is an important factor in healthcare utilization, though it is closely intertwined with economic status. An individual may not go to a medical professional or seek care if they do not know the ills of their failure to do so, or the value of proper treatment.

In Tajikistan, since the nation gained its independence, the likelihood of giving birth at home has increased rapidly among women with lower educational status. Education also has a significant impact on the quality of prenatal and maternal healthcare. Mothers with primary education consulted a doctor during pregnancy at significantly lower rates (72%) when compared to those with a secondary education (77%), technical training (88%) or a higher education (100%). There is also evidence for a correlation between socioeconomic status and health literacy; one study showed that wealthier Tanzanian families were more likely to recognize disease in their children than those that were coming from lower income backgrounds.

Social inequities are a key barrier to accessing health-related educational resources. Patients in lower socioeconomic areas will have less access to information about health in general, leading to less awareness of different diseases and health issues. Health education has proven to be a strong preventative measure that can be taken to decrease levels of illness and increase levels of visiting healthcare providers. The lack of health education can contribute to worsened health outcomes in these areas.

Education inequities are also closely associated with health inequities. Individuals with lower levels of education are more likely to incur greater health risks such as substance abuse, obesity, and injuries both intentional and unintentional. Education is also associated with greater comprehension of health information and services necessary to make the right health decisions, as well as being associated with a longer lifespan. Health literacy, defined as an individual's ability to access, understand, and apply health information, is an important part of understanding education inequities when it comes to health. Challenges with health literacy can lead to misuse of medication, missing important appointments, or increased hospitalization if individuals are not able to understand, discuss, and put into effect the information provided. Individuals with high grades have been observed to display more consistent engagement in healthy lifestyle choices and fewer instances of harmful habits than their less academically gifted counterparts. Factors such as poor diets, inadequate physical activity, physical and emotional abuse, and teenage pregnancy all have significant impacts on students' academic performance and these factors tend to manifest themselves more frequently in lower-income individuals.

== Spatial disparities in health ==
For some populations, access to healthcare and health resources is physically limited, resulting in health inequities. For instance, an individual might be physically incapable of traveling the distances required to reach healthcare services, or long distances can make seeking regular care unappealing despite the potential benefits.

In 2019, the federal government identified nearly 80 percent of rural America as "medically underserved," lacking in skilled nursing facilities, as well as rehabilitation, psychiatric and intensive care units. In rural areas, there are approximately 68 primary care doctors per 100,000 people, whereas there are 84 doctors per 100,000 in urban centers. According to the National Rural Health Association, almost 10% of rural counties had no doctors in 2017. Rural communities face lower life expectancies and increased rates of diabetes, chronic disease, and obesity. There is a physical difference in access healthcare as well, for emergency instances or even therapies, where patients are to travel excessive distances to receive necessary care. These health disparities in rural areas are major problems. Over the pandemic, however, efforts were present to make healthcare more universal. In doing so, more awareness was given to rural populations. There are still things that need to be done, though, underlying health disparities in region are still prominent.

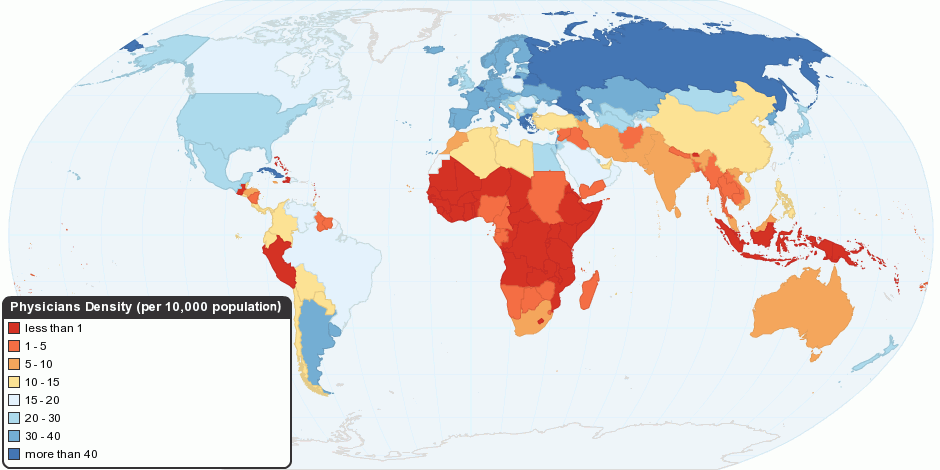
Global concentrations of healthcare resources, as depicted by the number of physicians per 100,000 individuals, by country.

Costa Rica, for example, has demonstrable health spatial inequities with 12–14% of the population living in areas where healthcare is inaccessible. Inequity has decreased in some areas of the nation as a result of the work of healthcare reform programs, however those regions not served by the programs have experienced a slight increase in inequity.

China experienced a serious decrease in spatial health equity following the reform and opening up in the 1980s as a result of the degradation of the Cooperative Medical System (CMS). The CMS provided an infrastructure for the delivery of healthcare to rural locations, as well as a framework to provide funding based upon communal contributions and government subsidies. In its absence, there was a significant decrease in the quantity of healthcare professionals (35.9%), as well as functioning clinics (from 71% to 55% of villages over 14 years) in rural areas, resulting in inequitable healthcare for rural populations. The significant poverty experienced by rural workers (some earning less than US$1 per day) further limits access to healthcare, and results in malnutrition and poor general hygiene, compounding the loss of healthcare resources. It is important to also note what rural areas are composed of. There are many rural counties that have disproportionate rates of minorities living there, a link between the racial issue at play and that of regional status. The loss of the CMS has had noticeable impacts on life expectancy, with rural regions such as areas of Western China experiencing significantly lower life expectancies.

Similarly, populations in rural Tajikistan experience spatial health inequities. A study by Jane Falkingham of the University of Southampton noted that physical access to healthcare was one of the primary factors influencing quality of maternal healthcare. Further, many women in rural areas of the country did not have adequate access to healthcare resources, resulting in poor maternal and neonatal care. These rural women were, for instance, far more likely to give birth in their homes without medical oversight.

== Ethnic and racial disparities ==
Along with the socioeconomic factor of health disparities, race is another key factor. The United States historically had large disparities in health and access to adequate healthcare between races, and current evidence supports the notion that these racially centered disparities continue to exist and are a significant social health issue. The disparities in access to adequate healthcare include differences in the quality of care based on race and overall insurance coverage based on race. A 2002 study in the Journal of the American Medical Association identifies race as a significant determinant in the level of quality of care, with Black people receiving lower quality care than their white counterparts. This is in part because members of ethnic minorities such as African Americans are either earning low incomes, or living below the poverty line. In a 2007 Census Bureau, African American families made an average of $33,916, while their white counterparts made an average of $54,920. Due to a lack of affordable health care, the African American death rate reveals that African Americans have a higher rate of dying from treatable or preventable causes. According to a study conducted in 2005 by the Office of Minority Health—a U.S. Department of Health—African American men were 30% more likely than white men to die from heart disease. Also African American women were 34% more likely to die from breast cancer than their white counterparts. Additionally, among African American and Latino infants, mortality rates are 2 to 3 times higher than other racial groups. An analysis of more than 2 million pregnancies found that babies born to Black women worldwide had poorer outcomes (such as baby death and stillbirth) than White women. This was true even after controlling for older age and a lower level of education among mothers (an indicator of poorer economic and social status). In the same analysis, Hispanic women were 3 times more likely to experience a baby death than White women and South Asian women had an increased risk of premature birth and having a baby with low birthweight compared with White women. Globally, immigrants and refugees are often at a higher risk of being in poverty, or experiencing depression or inadequate healthcare. This is a particular issue in the U.S., as racial and ethnic diversity continues to increase. A 2023 scoping review of the literature found that in studies involving multiracial or multiethnic populations, the incorporation of race or ethnicity variables lacked thoughtful conceptualization and informative analysis concerning their role as indicators of exposure to racialized social disadvantage. Racialized social disadvantage encompasses systemic and structural barriers, discrimination, and social exclusion experienced by individuals and communities based on their race or ethnicity, resulting in disparities in access to resources, opportunities, and health outcomes.

Such disparities also prevalently attack indigenous communities. As members of indigenous communities adjust to western lifestyles, they have become more susceptible to developing certain chronic illnesses.

There are also considerable racial disparities in access to insurance coverage, with ethnic minorities generally having less insurance coverage than non-ethnic minorities. For example, Hispanic Americans tend to have less insurance coverage than white Americans and as a result receive less regular medical care. The level of insurance coverage is directly correlated with access to healthcare including preventive and ambulatory care. A 2010 study on racial and ethnic disparities in health done by the Institute of Medicine has shown that the aforementioned disparities cannot solely be accounted for in terms of certain demographic characteristics like: insurance status, household income, education, age, geographic location and quality of living conditions. Even when the researchers corrected for these factors, the disparities persist. Slavery has contributed to disparate health outcomes for generations of African Americans in the United States.

Ethnic health inequities also appear in nations across the African continent. A survey of the child mortality of major ethnic groups across 11 African nations (Central African Republic, Côte d'Ivoire, Ghana, Kenya, Mali, Namibia, Niger, Rwanda, Senegal, Uganda, and Zambia) was published in 2000 by the WHO. The study described the presence of significant ethnic parities in the child mortality rates among children younger than 5 years old, as well as in education and vaccine use. In South Africa, the legacy of apartheid still manifests itself as a differential access to social services, including healthcare based upon race and social class, and the resultant health inequities. Further, evidence suggests systematic disregard of indigenous populations in a number of countries. The Pygmies of Congo, for instance, are excluded from government health programs, discriminated against during public health campaigns, and receive poorer overall healthcare.

In a survey of five European countries (Sweden, Switzerland, the UK, Italy, and France), a 1995 survey noted that only Sweden provided access to translators for 100% of those who needed it, while the other countries lacked this service potentially compromising healthcare to non-native populations. Given that non-natives composed a considerable section of these nations (6%, 17%, 3%, 1%, and 6% respectively), this could have significant detrimental effects on the health equity of the nation. In France, an older study noted significant differences in access to healthcare between native French populations, and non-French/migrant populations based upon health expenditure; however this was not fully independent of poorer economic and working conditions experienced by these populations.

A 1996 study of race-based health inequity in Australia revealed that Aboriginal populations experienced higher rates of mortality than non-Aboriginal populations. Aboriginal populations experienced 10 times greater mortality in the 30–40 age range; 2.5 times greater infant mortality rate, and 3 times greater age standardized mortality rate. Rates of diarrheal diseases and tuberculosis are also significantly greater in this population (16 and 15 times greater respectively), which is indicative of the poor healthcare of this ethnic group. At this point in time, the parities in life expectancy at birth between indigenous and non-indigenous peoples were highest in Australia, when compared to the US, Canada and New Zealand. In South America, indigenous populations faced similarly poor health outcomes with maternal and infant mortality rates that were significantly higher (up to 3 to 4 times greater) than the national average. The same pattern of poor indigenous healthcare continues in India, where indigenous groups were shown to experience greater mortality at most stages of life, even when corrected for environmental effects.

Due to systemic health and social inequities people from racial and ethnic minority groups in the United States are disproportionately affected by COVID-19.

On February 5, 2021, the head of the World Health Organization (WHO), Tedros Adhanom Ghebreyesus, noted regarding the global inequity in the access to COVID-19 vaccines, that almost 130 countries had not yet given a single dose. In early April 2021, the WHO reported that 87% of existing vaccines had been distributed to the wealthiest countries, while only 0.2% had been distributed to the poorest countries. As a result, one-quarter of the populations of those wealthy countries had already been vaccinated, while only 1 in 500 residents of the poor countries had been vaccinated.

== Sex and gender in healthcare equity ==
Gender and sex are both components of health disparity.

=== Sex and gender in medicine ===
Both gender and sex are significant factors that influence health. Sex is characterized by female and male biological differences in regards to gene expression, hormonal concentration, and anatomical characteristics. Gender is an expression of behavior and lifestyle choices. Both sex and gender inform each other, and differences between genders influence disease manifestation and associated healthcare approaches. Understanding how the interaction of sex and gender contributes to disparity in the context of health allows providers to ensure quality outcomes for patients. This interaction is complicated by the difficulty of distinguishing between sex and gender given their intertwined nature; sex modifies gender, and gender can modify sex, thereby impacting health. Sex and gender can both be considered sources of health disparity; both contribute to susceptibility to various health conditions, including cardiovascular disease and autoimmune disorders. Historically, research on medicine and treatment have surrounded around the men and the male body. The gaps in research on the female body and treatment approaches have resulted in less effective care for women. Unfortunately, this results in under and misdiagnosed diseases for women.

=== Gender disparities in life expectancy ===
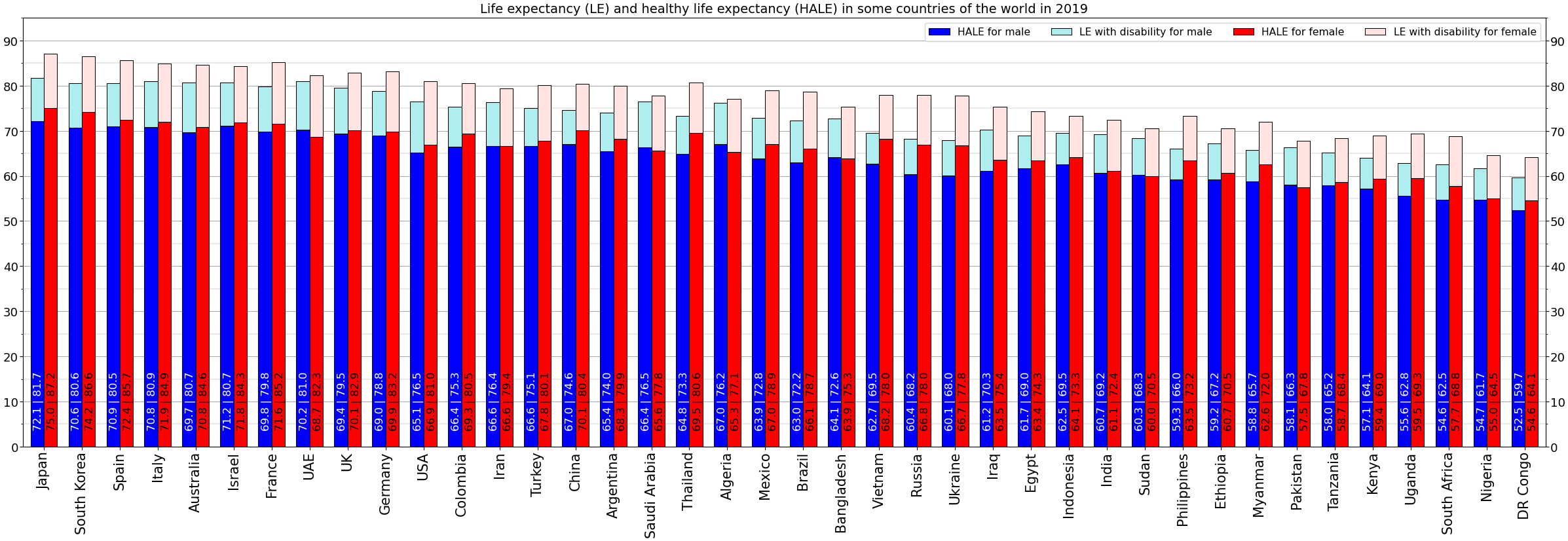
Sex differences in Life expectancy and healthy life expectancy

In most regions of the world, the mortality rate is higher for adult men than for adult women; for example, adult men develop fatal illnesses with more frequency than females. The list of countries by life expectancy shows the sex gap in life expectancy. The leading causes of the higher male death rate are accidents, injuries, violence, and cardiovascular diseases. In most regions of the world, violence and traffic-related injuries account for the majority of mortality of adolescent males. Women in the United States tend to live longer than men. Physicians tend to offer invasive procedures to male patients more often than to female patients. The 2012 World Development Report (WDR) noted that women in developing nations experience greater mortality rates than men in developing nations.

=== Other gender disparities in health ===
==== Male disadvantage ====
Men are more likely to smoke than women and experience smoking-related health complications later in life as a result; this trend is also observed in regard to other substances, such as marijuana, in Jamaica, where the rate of use is 2–3 times more for men than women. Men are also more likely to have severe chronic conditions.

==== Female disadvantage ====
In developing countries, males tend to have a health advantage over women due to gender discrimination, evidenced by infanticide, early marriage, and domestic abuse for females.

Women in developing countries have a much higher risk of maternal death than those in developed countries. The highest risk of dying during childbirth is 1 in 6 in Afghanistan and Sierra Leone, compared to nearly 1 in 30,000 in Sweden—a disparity that is much greater than that for neonatal or child mortality.

Women are generally are of lower socioeconomic status (SES) in USA and have more barriers to accessing healthcare, and higher rates of depression and chronic stress and negative impact health. In Europe, women who grew up in poverty are more likely to have lower muscle strength and higher disability in old age.

Women are also more likely than men to suffer from sexual or intimate-partner violence both in the United States and worldwide. Women have better access to healthcare in the United States than they do in many other places in the world, yet having sufficient health insurance to afford the care, such as related to postpartum treatment and care, may help to avoid additional preventable hospital readmission and emergency department visits.

In one population study conducted in Harlem, New York, 86% of women reported having privatized or publicly assisted health insurance, while only 74% of men reported having any health insurance. This trend is representative of the general population of the United States. On the other hand, a woman's access to healthcare in rural communities has recently become a matter of concern. Access to maternal obstetric care has decreased in rural communities due to the increase in both hospital closers and labor & delivery center closures that have placed an increased burden on families living in these areas. Burdens faced by women in these rural communities include financial burdens on traveling to receive adequate care. Millions of individuals living in rural areas in the United States are more at risk of having decreased access to maternal health care facilities if the community is low-income. These women are more at risk of experiencing adverse maternal outcomes like a higher risk of having postpartum depression, having an out-of-hospital birth, and on the extreme end, maternal morbidity and mortality.

In addition, women's pain tends to be treated less seriously and initially ignored by clinicians when compared to their treatment of men's pain complaints. Historically, women have not been included in the design or practice of clinical trials, which has slowed the understanding of women's reactions to medications and created a research gap. This has led to post-approval adverse events among women, resulting in several drugs being pulled from the market. However, the clinical research industry is aware of the problem, and has made progress in correcting it.

=== Cultural factors ===
Health disparities are also due in part to cultural factors that involve practices based not only on sex, but also gender status. For example, in China, health disparities have distinguished medical treatment for men and women due to the cultural phenomenon of preference for male children. Recently, gender-based disparities have decreased as females have begun to receive higher-quality care. Additionally, a girl's chances of survival are impacted by the presence of a male sibling; while girls do have the same chance of survival as boys if they are the oldest girl, they have a higher probability of being aborted or dying young if they have an older sister.

In India, gender-based health inequities are apparent in early childhood. Many families provide better nutrition for boys in the interest of maximizing future productivity given that boys are generally seen as breadwinners. In addition, boys receive better care than girls and are hospitalized at a greater rate. The magnitude of these disparities increases with the severity of poverty in a given population.

Additionally, the cultural practice of female genital mutilation (FGM) is known to impact women's health, though is difficult to know the worldwide extent of this practice. While generally thought of as a Sub-Saharan African practice, it may have roots in the Middle East as well. The estimated 3 million girls who are subjected to FGM each year potentially suffer both immediate and lifelong negative effects. Immediately following FGM, girls commonly experience excessive bleeding and urine retention. Long-term consequences include urinary tract infections, bacterial vaginosis, pain during intercourse, and difficulties in childbirth that include prolonged labor, vaginal tears, and excessive bleeding. Women who have undergone FGM also have higher rates of post-traumatic stress disorder (PTSD) and herpes simplex virus 2 (HSV2) than women who have not.

=== LGBTQ health disparities ===
Sexuality and gender identity are the basis of health discrimination and inequity throughout the world. Homosexual, bisexual, transgender, and gender-variant populations around the world experience a range of health problems related to their sexuality and gender identity, some of which are complicated further by limited research.

In spite of recent advances, LGBTQ populations in China, India, and Chile continue to face significant discrimination and barriers to care. The World Health Organization (WHO) recognizes that there is inadequate research data about the effects of LGBTQ discrimination on morbidity and mortality rates in the patient population. In addition, retrospective epidemiological studies on LGBTQ populations are difficult to conduct as a result of the practice that sexual orientation is not noted on death certificates. WHO has proposed that more research about the LGBTQ patient population is needed for improved understanding of its unique health needs and barriers to accessing care.

One of the main forms of healthcare discrimination LGBTQ individuals face is discrimination from healthcare workers or institutions themselves. LGBTQ people often face significant difficulties in accessing care as a result to discrimination and homophobia from healthcare professionals. This discrimination can take the form of verbal abuse, disrespectful conduct, refusal of care, the withholding of health information, inadequate treatment, and outright violence.

Additionally, members of the LGBTQ community contend with health care disparities due, in part, to lack of provider training and awareness of the population's healthcare needs. Transgender individuals believe that there is a higher importance of providing gender identity (GI) information more than sexual orientation (SO) to providers to help inform them of better care and safe treatment for these patients. Studies regarding patient-provider communication in the LGBTQ patient community show that providers themselves report a significant lack of awareness regarding the health issues LGBTQ-identifying patients face. As a component of this fact, medical schools do not focus much attention on LGBTQ health issues in their curriculum; the LGBTQ-related topics that are discussed tend to be limited to HIV/AIDS, sexual orientation, and gender identity.

Among LGBTQ-identifying individuals, transgender individuals face especially significant barriers to treatment. Many countries still do not have legal recognition of transgender or non-binary gender individuals leading to placement in misgendered hospital wards and medical discrimination. Seventeen European states mandate sterilization of individuals who seek recognition of a gender identity that diverges from their birth gender. In addition to many of the same barriers as the rest of the LGBTQ community, globally the transgender individuals often also face a higher disease burden. Transgender people also face significant levels of discrimination. Due to this experience, many transgender people avoid seeking necessary medical care out of fear of discrimination.

The stigmatization represented particularly in the transgender population creates a health disparity for LGBTQ individuals with regard to mental health. The LGBTQ community is at increased risk for psychosocial distress, mental health complications, suicidality, homelessness, and substance abuse, often complicated by access-based under-utilization or fear of health services. Transgender and gender-variant individuals have been found to experience higher rates of mental health disparity than LGB individuals.

These mental health facts are informed by a history of anti-LGBTQ bias in health care. The Diagnostic and Statistical Manual of Mental Disorders (DSM) listed homosexuality as a disorder until 1973; transgender status was listed as a disorder until 2012. This was amended in 2013 with the DSM-5 when "gender identity disorder" was replaced with "gender dysphoria", reflecting that simply identifying as transgender is not itself pathological and that the diagnosis is instead for the distress a transgender person may experience as a result of the discordance between assigned gender and gender identity.

LGBTQ health issues have received disproportionately low levels of medical research, leading to difficulties in assessing appropriate strategies for LGBTQ treatment. For instance, a review of medical literature regarding LGBTQ patients revealed that there are significant gaps in the medical understanding of cervical cancer in lesbian and bisexual individuals it is unclear whether its prevalence in this community is a result of probability or some other preventable cause. For example, LGBTQ people report poorer cancer care experiences. It is incorrectly assumed that LGBTQ women have a lower incidence of cervical cancer than their heterosexual counterparts, resulting in lower rates of screening. Such findings illustrate the need for continued research focused on the circumstances and needs of LGBTQ individuals and the inclusion in policy frameworks of sexual orientation and gender identity as social determinants of health.

LGB people are at higher risk of some cancers and LGBTQI are at higher risk of mental illness. The causes of these health inequities are "i) cultural and social norms that preference and prioritise heterosexuality; ii) minority stress associated with sexual orientation, gender identity and sex characteristics; iii) victimisation; iv) discrimination (individual and institutional), and; v) stigma."

== Environmental influences ==
Minority populations have increased exposure to environmental hazards that include lack of neighborhood resources, structural and community factors as well as residential segregation that result in a cycle of disease and stress. The environment that surrounds us can influence individual behaviors and lead to poor health choices and therefore outcomes. Minority neighborhoods have been continuously noted to have more fast food chains and fewer grocery stores than predominantly white neighborhoods. These food deserts affect a family's ability to have easy access to nutritious food for their children. This lack of nutritious food extends beyond the household into the schools that have a variety of vending machines and deliver over processed foods. A related concept that impacts food choices is the prevalence of food swamps, or areas with overexposure to fast-food options.These environmental condition have social ramifications and in the first time in US history is it projected that the current generation will live shorter lives than their predecessors will.

In addition, minority neighborhoods have various health hazards that result from living close to highways and toxic waste factories or general dilapidated structures and streets. These environmental conditions create varying degrees of health risk from noise pollution, to carcinogenic toxic exposures from asbestos and radon that result in increase chronic disease, morbidity, and mortality. The quality of residential environment such as damaged housing has been shown to increase the risk of adverse birth outcomes, which is reflective of a communities health. This occurs through exposure to lead in paint and lead contaminated soil as well as indoor air pollutants such as second-hand smoke and fine particulate matter. Housing conditions can create varying degrees of health risk that lead to complications of birth and long-term consequences in the aging population. In addition, occupational hazards can add to the detrimental effects of poor housing conditions. It has been reported that a greater number of minorities work in jobs that have higher rates of exposure to toxic chemical, dust and fumes. One example of this is the environmental hazards that poor Latino farmworkers face in the United States. This group is exposed to high levels of particulate matter and pesticides on the job, which have contributed to increased cancer rates, lung conditions, and birth defects in their communities.

Racial segregation is another environmental factor that occurs through the discriminatory action of those organizations and working individuals within the real estate industry, whether in the housing markets or rentals. Even though residential segregation is noted in all minority groups, Black people tend to be segregated regardless of income level when compared to Latinos and Asians. Thus, segregation results in minorities clustering in poor neighborhoods that have limited employment, medical care, and educational resources, which is associated with high rates of criminal behavior. In addition, segregation affects the health of individual residents because the environment is not conducive to physical exercise due to unsafe neighborhoods that lack recreational facilities and have nonexistent park space. Racial and ethnic discrimination adds an additional element to the environment that individuals have to interact with daily. Individuals that reported discrimination have been shown to have an increase risk of hypertension in addition to other physiological stress related affects. The high magnitude of environmental, structural, socioeconomic stressors leads to further compromise on the psychological and physical being, which leads to poor health and disease.

Individuals living in rural areas, especially poor rural areas, have access to fewer health care resources. Although 20 percent of the U.S. population lives in rural areas, only 9 percent of physicians practice in rural settings. Individuals in rural areas typically must travel longer distances for care, experience long waiting times at clinics, or are unable to obtain the necessary health care they need in a timely manner. Rural areas characterized by a largely Hispanic population average 5.3 physicians per 10,000 residents compared with 8.7 physicians per 10,000 residents in non-rural areas. Financial barriers to access, including lack of health insurance, are also common among the urban poor. What is more concerning is that the minorities in rural areas participate in research even less than the minorities in urban areas, which can be understood as a very noticeable and unhealthy difference given that minorities in urban areas are already lacking in health research participation. A recent self-study showed that people in Arkansas were mostly willing to participate in studies, but lacked the opportunity, and that minority groups, including Black and Hispanic groups, were more likely to express this interest than that of others, yet they generally lack the opportunity to actually commit to it.

== Disparities in access to health care ==
Reasons for disparities in access to health care are many, but can include the following:

- Lack of a regular source of care. Without access to a regular source of care, patients have greater difficulty obtaining care, fewer doctor visits, and more difficulty obtaining prescription drugs. Compared to whites, minority groups in the United States are less likely to have a doctor they go to on a regular basis and are more likely to use emergency rooms and clinics as their regular source of care. In the United Kingdom, which is much more racially harmonious, this issue arises for a different reason; since 2004, NHS GPs have not been responsible for care out of normal GP surgery opening hours, leading to significantly higher attendances in A+E
- Lack of financial resources. Although the lack of financial resources is a barrier to health care access for many Americans, the impact on access appears to be greater for minority populations.
- Legal barriers. Access to medical care by low-income immigrant minorities can be hindered by legal barriers to public insurance programs. For example, in the United States federal law bars states from providing Medicaid coverage to immigrants who have been in the country fewer than five years. Another example could be when a non-English speaking person attends a clinic where the receptionist does not speak the person's language. This is mostly seen in people who have limited English proficiency, or LEP.
- Structural barriers. These barriers include poor transportation, an inability to schedule appointments quickly or during convenient hours, and excessive time spent in the waiting room, all of which affect a person's ability and willingness to obtain needed care.
- Scarcity of providers. In inner cities, rural areas, and communities with high concentrations of minority populations, access to medical care can be limited due to the scarcity of primary care practitioners, specialists, and diagnostic facilities. This scarcity can also extend to the personnel in the medical laboratory with some geographical regions having significantly diminished access to advanced diagnostic methods and pathology care. In the UK, Monitor (a quango) has a legal obligation to ensure that sufficient provision exists in all parts of the nation.
- Reaching rural areas. Access to healthcare in rural areas remains a significant challenge due to factors such as geographic isolation, limited healthcare, infrastructure, and shortages of medical providers. Rural communities often lack sufficient healthcare facilities and personnel, leading to long travel distances and wait times for necessary care. Additionally, financial barriers, lack of health insurance, and limited transportation options further worsen the difficulties faced by rural populations in accessing healthcare. These barriers not only limit the frequency and quality of care but also contribute to worse health outcomes compared to urban populations. To address these disparities, targeted interventions, such as improving healthcare infrastructure, expanding mobile clinics (specialized vehicles with trained personnel to treat those of populations where healthcare is not accessible), and increasing provider incentives to work in rural areas, may be necessary.
- The health care financing system. The Institute of Medicine in the United States says fragmentation of the U.S. health care delivery and financing system is a barrier to accessing care. Racial and ethnic minorities are more likely to be enrolled in health insurance plans which place limits on covered services and offer a limited number of health care providers.
- Linguistic barriers. Language differences restrict access to medical care for minorities in the United States who have limited English proficiency.
- Health literacy. This is where patients have problems obtaining, processing, and understanding basic health information. For example, patients with a poor understanding of good health may not know when it is necessary to seek care for certain symptoms. While problems with health literacy are not limited to minority groups, the problem can be more pronounced in these groups than in whites due to socioeconomic and educational factors. A study conducted in Mdantsane, South Africa depicts the correlation of maternal education and the antenatal visits for pregnancy. As patients have a greater education, they tend to use maternal health care services more than those with a lesser maternal education background.
- Lack of diversity in the health care workforce. A major reason for disparities in access to care are the cultural differences between predominantly white health care providers and minority patients. Only 4% of physicians in the United States are African American, and Hispanics represent just 5%, even though these percentages are much less than their groups' proportion of the United States population.
- Age. Age can also be a factor in health disparities for a number of reasons. As many older Americans exist on fixed incomes which may make paying for health care expenses difficult. Additionally, they may face other barriers such as impaired mobility or lack of transportation which make accessing health care services challenging for them physically. Also, they may not have the opportunity to access health information via the internet as less than 15% of Americans over the age of 65 have access to the internet. This could put older individuals at a disadvantage in terms of accessing valuable information about their health and how to protect it. On the other hand, older individuals in the US (65 or above) are provided with medical care via Medicare.
- Criminalization and lack of research of traditional medicine, and mental health treatments. Mental illness accounts for about one-third of adult disability globally. Conventional drug treatments have dominated psychiatry for decades, without a breakthrough in mental healthcare. Access to psychedelic-assisted therapy, and the decriminalization of Psilocybin and other entheogens are questions of health justice.

=== Health insurance ===
A major part of the United States' healthcare system is health insurance. The main types of health insurance in the United States includes taxpayer-funded health insurance and private health insurance. Funded through state and federal taxes, some common examples of taxpayer-funded health insurance include Medicaid, Medicare, and CHIP. Private health insurance is offered in a variety of forms, and includes plans such as Health Maintenance Organizations (HMO's) and Preferred Provider Organization (PPO's). While health insurance increases the affordability of healthcare in the United States, issues of access along with additional related issues act as barriers to health equity.

There are many issues due to health insurance that affect health equity, including the following:

- Health Insurance Literacy. Within these health insurance plans, common aspects of the insurance include premiums, deductibles, co-payments, coinsurance, coverage limits, in-network versus out-of-network providers, and prior authorization. According to a United Health survey, only 9% of Americans surveyed understood these health insurance terms. To address issues in finding available insurance plans and confusion around the components of health insurance policies, the Affordable Care Act (ACA) set up state-mandated health insurance marketplaces or health exchanges, where individuals can research and compare different kinds of health care plans and their respective components. Between 2014 and 2020, over 11.4 million people have been able to sign up for health insurance through the Marketplaces. However, most Marketplaces focus more on the presentation of health insurances and their coverages, rather than including detailed explanations of the health insurance terms.
- Lack of universal health care or health insurance coverage. According to the Congressional Budget Office (CBO), 28.9 million people in the United States were uninsured in 2018, and that number would rise to an estimated 35 million people by 2029. Without health insurance, patients are more likely to postpone medical care, go without needed medical care, go without prescription medicines, and be denied access to care. Minority groups in the United States lack insurance coverage at higher rates than whites. This problem does not exist in countries with fully funded public health systems, such as the examplar of the NHS.
- Underinsured or inefficient health insurance coverage. While there are many causes of underinsurance, a common a reason is due to low premiums, the up front yearly or monthly amount individuals pay for their insurance policy, and high deductibles, the amount paid out of pocket by the policy holder before an insurance provider will pay any expenses. Under the ACA, individuals were subject to a fee called the Shared Responsibility Payment, which occurred as a result of not buying health insurance despite being able to afford it. While this mandate was aimed at increasing health insurance rates for Americans, it also led many individuals to sign up for relatively inexpensive health insurance plans that did not provide adequate health coverage in order to avoid the repercussions of the mandate. Similar to those who lack health insurance, these underinsured individuals also deal with the side effects that occur as a result of lack of care.

=== Dental healthcare ===
In many countries, dental healthcare is less accessible than other kinds of healthcare resulting in increased risk for oral and systemic diseases. In Western countries, dental healthcare providers are present, and private or public healthcare systems typically facilitate access. However, access remains limited for marginalized groups such as the homeless, racial minorities, and those who are homebound or disabled. In Central and Eastern Europe, the privatization of dental healthcare has resulted in a shortage of affordable options for lower-income people. In Eastern Europe, school-age children formerly had access through school programs, but these have been discontinued. Therefore, many children no longer have access to care. Access to services and the breadth of services provided is greatly reduced in developing regions. Such services may be limited to emergency care and pain relief, neglecting preventative or restorative services. Regions like Africa, Asia, and Latin America do not have enough dental health professionals to meet the needs of the populace. In Africa, for example, there is only one dentist for every 150,000 people, compared to industrialized countries which average one dentist per 2,000 people.

== Disparities in quality of health care ==
Health disparities in the quality of care exist and are based on language and ethnicity/race which includes:

=== Problems with patient-provider communication ===
Communication is critical for the delivery of appropriate and effective treatment and care, regardless of a patient's race, and miscommunication can lead to incorrect diagnosis, improper use of medications, and failure to receive follow-up care. The patient provider relationship is dependent on the ability of both individuals to effectively communicate. Language and culture both play a significant role in communication during a medical visit. Among the patient population, minorities face greater difficulty in communicating with their physicians. For example, Asian-American patients were reported to have both less trust and satisfaction with their healthcare providers than that of white patients, and so by a substantial amount. Not only cultural and communication errors arise from here, but also those of racial constraints that have patterned American history for years. This is all occurring even when the Asian-American population stands as one of the fastest growing. Despite being the only racial/ethnic group that has cancer as the leading cause of death, they are also linked to extremely low rates of cancer screenings. It is not that they can't, since Asian Americans typically find themselves in the more economically stable side of American society. It is based largely, though, on the distrusts felt by this group towards healthcare providers. In another study, patients when surveyed responded that 19% of the time they have problems communicating with their providers which included understanding doctor, feeling doctor listened, and had questions but did not ask. In contrast, the Hispanic population had the largest problem communicating with their provider, 33% of the time. Minority groups are also less likely to have a care provider from the same background. This can create a feeling of disconnect between the patient and the provider, separating trust from the equation. People are more likely to feel close to others alike. In healthcare, where a strong relationship between the patient and provider is necessary, it could help for the provider and patient to be similar in some way. Communication has been linked to health outcomes, as communication improves so does patient satisfaction which leads to improved compliance and then to improved health outcomes. Quality of care is impacted as a result of an inability to communicate with health care providers. Language plays a pivotal role in communication and efforts need to be taken to ensure excellent communication between patient and provider. Among limited English proficient patients in the United States, the linguistic barrier is even greater. Less than half of non-English speakers who say they need an interpreter during clinical visits report having one. The absence of interpreters during a clinical visit adds to the communication barrier. Furthermore, inability of providers to communicate with limited English proficient patients leads to more diagnostic procedures, more invasive procedures, and over prescribing of medications. Language barriers have not only hindered appointment scheduling, prescription filling, and clear communications, but have also been associated with health declines, which can be attributed to reduced compliance and delays in seeking care, which could affect particularly refugee health in the United States. Many health-related settings provide interpreter services for their limited English proficient patients. This has been helpful when providers do not speak the same language as the patient. However, there is mounting evidence that patients need to communicate with a language concordant physician (not simply an interpreter) to receive the best medical care, bond with the physician, and be satisfied with the care experience. Having patient-physician language discordant pairs (i.e. Spanish-speaking patient with an English-speaking physician) may also lead to greater medical expenditures and thus higher costs to the organization. Additional communication problems result from a decrease or lack of cultural competence by providers. It is important for providers to be cognizant of patients' health beliefs and practices without being judgmental or reacting. Understanding a patients' view of health and disease is important for diagnosis and treatment. So providers need to assess patients' health beliefs and practices to improve quality of care. Patient health decisions can be influenced by religious beliefs, mistrust of Western medicine, and familial and hierarchical roles, all of which a white provider may not be familiar with. Other type of communication problems are seen in LGBTQ health care with the spoken heterosexist (conscious or unconscious) attitude on LGBTQ patients, lack of understanding on issues like having no sex with men (lesbians, gynecologic examinations) and other issues. The same types of problems too exist in people with disabilities, who still to this day face the effects from past Western medicine procedures that brought injustice to their community.

=== Provider discrimination ===
Provider discrimination occurs when health care providers either unconsciously or consciously treat certain racial and ethnic patients differently from other patients. This may be due to stereotypes that providers may have towards ethnic/racial groups. A March, 2000 study from Social Science & Medicine suggests that doctors may be more likely to ascribe negative racial stereotypes to their minority patients. This may occur regardless of consideration for education, income, and personality characteristics. Two types of stereotypes may be involved, automatic stereotypes or goal modified stereotypes. Automated stereotyping is when stereotypes are automatically activated and influence judgments/behaviors outside of consciousness. Goal modified stereotype is a more conscious process, done when specific needs of clinician arise (time constraints, filling in gaps in information needed) to make a complex decisions. Physicians are unaware of their implicit biases. Some research suggests that ethnic minorities are less likely than whites to receive a kidney transplant once on dialysis or to receive pain medication for bone fractures. Critics question this research and say further studies are needed to determine how doctors and patients make their treatment decisions. Others argue that certain diseases cluster by ethnicity and that clinical decision making does not always reflect these differences.

=== Lack of preventive care ===
According to the 2009 National Healthcare Disparities Report, uninsured Americans are less likely to receive preventive services in health care. For example, minorities are not regularly screened for colon cancer and the death rate for colon cancer has increased among African Americans and Hispanic populations. Furthermore, limited English proficient patients are also less likely to receive preventive health services such as mammograms. Studies have shown that use of professional interpreters have significantly reduced disparities in the rates of fecal occult testing, flu immunizations and pap smears. In the UK, Public Health England, a universal service free at the point of use, which forms part of the NHS, offers regular screening to any member of the population considered to be in an at-risk group (such as individuals over 45) for major disease (such as colon cancer, or diabetic-retinopathy).

== Plans for achieving health equity ==
There are a multitude of strategies for achieving health equity and reducing disparities outlined in scholarly texts, some examples include:

- Advocacy. Advocacy for health equity has been identified as a key means of promoting favourable policy change. EuroHealthNet carried out a systematic review of the academic and grey literature. It found, amongst other things, that certain kinds of evidence may be more persuasive in advocacy efforts, that practices associated with knowledge transfer and translation can increase the uptake of knowledge, that there are many different potential advocates and targets of advocacy and that advocacy efforts need to be tailored according to context and target. As a result of its work, it produced an online advocacy for health equity toolkit.
- Provider based incentives to improve healthcare for ethnic populations. One source of health inequity stems from unequal treatment of non-white patients in comparison with white patients. Creating provider based incentives to create greater parity between treatment of white and non-white patients is one proposed solution to eliminate provider bias. These incentives typically are monetary because of its effectiveness in influencing physician behavior.
- Using Evidence Based Medicine (EBM). Evidence Based Medicine (EBM) shows promise in reducing healthcare provider bias in turn promoting health equity. In theory EBM can reduce disparities however other research suggests that it might exacerbate them instead. Some cited shortcomings include EBM's injection of clinical inflexibility in decision making and its origins as a purely cost driven measure.
- Increasing awareness. The most cited measure to improving health equity relates to increasing public awareness. A lack of public awareness is a key reason why there has not been significant gains in reducing health disparities in ethnic and minority populations. Increased public awareness would lead to increased congressional awareness, greater availability of disparity data, and further research into the issue of health disparities.
- The Gradient Evaluation Framework. The evidence base defining which policies and interventions are most effective in reducing health inequalities is extremely weak. It is important therefore that policies and interventions which seek to influence health inequity be more adequately evaluated. Gradient Evaluation Framework (GEF) is an action-oriented policy tool that can be applied to assess whether policies will contribute to greater health equity amongst children and their families.
- The AIM framework. In a pilot study, researchers examined the role of AIM—ability, incentives, and management feedback—in reducing care disparity in pressure-ulcer detection between African American and Caucasian residents. The results showed that while the program was implemented, the provision of (1) training to enhance ability, (2) monetary incentives to enhance motivation, and (3) management feedback to enhance accountability led to successful reduction in pressure ulcers. Specifically, the detection gap between the two groups decreased. The researchers suggested additional replications with longer duration to assess the effectiveness of the AIM framework.
- Monitoring actions on the social determinants of health. In 2017, citing the need for accountability for the pledges made by countries in the Rio Political Declaration on Social Determinants of Health, the World Health Organization and United Nations Children's Fund called for the monitoring of intersectoral interventions on the social determinants of health that improve health equity.
- Changing the distribution of health services. Health services play a major role in health equity. Health inequities stem from lack of access to care due to poor economic status and an interaction among other social determinants of health. The majority of high quality health services are distributed among the wealthy people in society, leaving those who are poor with limited options. In order to change this fact and move towards achieving health equity, it is essential that health care increases in areas or neighborhoods consisting of low socioeconomic families and individuals.
- Prioritize treatment among the poor. Because of the challenges that arise from accessing health care with low economic status, many illnesses and injuries go untreated or are not given sufficient treatment. Promoting treatment as a priority among the poor will give them the resources they need in order to achieve good health, because health is a basic human right.
- Implementing medical pluralism. Extreme differences that underlie urban and alternative medicine approaches emphasize the need for a system that represents the duality of the populations it intends to serve. Urban medicine generally believes that technological advancement is the best way to help treat illness as it allows for a more "sophisticated" mode of care; alternative medicine is more traditional in relying solely on herbal and natural remedies believing that the elaborate institutions of urban care are not best suited for serving individual needs. Medical pluralism, hence, is an adaptive tactic most effective for communities that include Indigenous people, and mixed rural-urban populations. Medical pluralism acknowledges the needs of a variety of people and is a step closer to health equity. Medical pluralism "avoids the extremes'' of most current healthcare delivery approaches and provides a middle-ground perspective on tackling health issues that are not solved by urban or rural health alone. By practicing integrative medicine, chronic and unresolved health issues are better treated, borrowing from the technological and philosophical approaches of both models of care. Aimed at embracing both medical techniques, medical pluralism is currently being considered in nations with diverse communities; it is manifested in the practice of integrative medicine which is a deliberate execution of that approach. There are currently ongoing efforts to implement this dual model of healthcare delivery regionally in nations composed of very diverse communities, and such is the case in many Latin American countries such as Ecuador that have a large indigenous population. The process of successfully implementing an integrative healthcare system is discussed as having six main steps that pose different challenges. Guito et al.'s guidelines for each steps describes the first as being 'imperceptible integration" to the sixth being "total integration".
- Artificial Intelligence (AI) can be helpful in identifying and improving issues of health disparities. A recent scoping review of the literature found that it is important to engage with various communities while AI health applications are being developed and also reviewed based on various biases that are later identified through this work.
- Pandemic Treaty. The WHO's member states made health equity the central principle of the convention or other international instrument under negotiation.

=== G20's initiative for healthcare ===
In 2023, the G20 under its Affordable Healthcare Model Hospital initiative, with the Government of Andhra Pradesh, India, opened a 100-bed facility in Srikakulam, drawing support from the Aarogyasri scheme.

== Health inequalities ==
Health inequality is the term used in a number of countries to refer to those instances whereby the health of two demographic groups (not necessarily ethnic or racial groups) differs despite comparative access to health care services. Such examples include higher rates of morbidity and mortality for those in lower occupational classes than those in higher occupational classes, and the increased likelihood of those from ethnic minorities being diagnosed with a mental health disorder. In Canada, the issue was brought to public attention by the LaLonde report.

In UK, the Black Report was produced in 1980 to highlight inequalities. On 11 February 2010, Sir Michael Marmot, an epidemiologist at University College London, published the Fair Society, Healthy Lives report on the relationship between health and poverty. Marmot described his findings as illustrating a "social gradient in health": the life expectancy for the poorest is seven years shorter than for the most wealthy, and the poor are more likely to have a disability. In its report on this study, The Economist argued that the material causes of this contextual health inequality include unhealthful lifestyles – smoking remains more common, and obesity is increasing fastest, amongst the poor in Britain.

In June 2018, the European Commission launched the Joint Action Health Equity in Europe. Forty-nine participants from 25 European Union Member States will work together to address health inequalities and the underlying social determinants of health across Europe. Under the coordination of the Italian Institute of Public Health, the Joint Action aims to achieve greater equity in health in Europe across all social groups while reducing the inter-country heterogeneity in tackling health inequalities.

== Bias in research ==
Research to identify health inequities, how they arise and what can be done to address them is essential to securing health equity. However, the same exclusionary social structures that contribute to health inequities in society also influence and are reproduced by researchers and public health institutions. In other words, medicine and public health organizations have evolved to better meet the needs of some groups more than others. Candidate variance in research can be important to ensure a safe life for every individual equally. Precision medicine lacks in minority groups relative to its effectiveness in whites. While there are many examples of bias in medical and public health research, some general categories of exclusionary research practices include: 1) Structural invisibility – approaches to collection, analysis or publication of data which hide the potential contribution of social factors to the distribution of health risks or outcomes. For example, limitations in public health surveys in the United States to collect data on race, ethnicity, and nativity; (2) Institutionalized exclusion – codification of exclusionary social structures in research practices, instruments, and scientific models resulting in an inherent bias in favor of the normative group. For example, the definition of a human as an 80 kg man in toxicology; (3) Unexamined assumptions – cultural norms and unconscious bias that can impact all aspects of research. In other words, assuming that the researchers' perspective and understanding is objective and universally shared. For example, the lack of conceptual equivalence across multi-lingual survey instruments.

As an example, in the Asian-American subpopulation only, cancer is the leading cause of death. This could be a result of Asian-Americans being less likely to appear in studies of environmental factors on health, due to a false assumption that they are the same as whites. There is also a general distrust from the Asian-American population towards Western healthcare as a result of historical racial pressures and cultural differences. In recent years, governmental figures in the United States have pushed for change, especially with the recent pandemic bringing the accessibility of healthcare to the forefront. Whether their proposed solutions were considered appropriate differed on the audience. Different racial and ethnic groups were impacted by the pandemic to different extents, serving as an eye opener to major issues in health equity. For example, in the United States, most minority groups saw greater rates of infection, hospitalization, and death. There were also concerns in differences in vaccine efficacy, as many of the clinical trials in the development of COVID-19 vaccines did not consider safe and inclusive plans. Developing protocols specific to different groups equally could be a way to combat this.

== Health disparity and genomics ==
Genomics applications continue to increase in clinical/medical applications. Historically, results from studies do not include underrepresented communities and races. The question of who benefits from publicly funded genomics is an important public health consideration, and attention will be needed to ensure that implementation of genomic medicine does not further entrench social‐equity concerns. The utilization of genetic services is lower among rural communities, diverse ethnic and racial groups, and those with lower incomes, which can lead to adverse health and wellbeing. Currently the National Human Genome Research Institute counts with a Genomics and Health Disparities Interest Group to tackle the issues of accessibility and application of genomic medicine to communities not normally represented. The Director of the Health Disparities Group, Vence L. Bonham Jr., leads a team that seeks to qualify and better understand the disparities and reduce the gap in access to genetic counseling, inclusion of minority communities in original research, and access to genetic information to improve health. In 2024, the World Health Organization also proposed a genomics program to advocate for overcoming these issues. Specifically, promoting collaboration in the field and overcoming barriers against implementing methodologies that tackle disparities in access to genomics services.

There is some movement toward progress, though. Sickle cell disease, which disproportionately impacts Black people where every 1 of 365 births has the condition, is treatable with gene therapy. In December 2023, the United States Food and Drug Administration (FDA) approved two gene therapy treatments that use gene editing machinery known as CRISPR/Cas9 to alleviate the sickling of the red blood cells. This will greatly improve the livelihoods of millions, but especially people of color who are much more at risk for this condition.

== See also ==
- Antisemitism in health care
- Biological inequity
- Center for Minority Health
- Drift hypothesis
- EuroHealthNet
- Environmental justice
- Environmental racism
- Environmental racism in the United States
- Food Justice Movement
- Global health
- Global Task Force on Expanded Access to Cancer Care and Control in Developing Countries
- Health care
- Health care rationing
- Health economics
- Health-related embarrassment
- Health Disparities Center
- Health inequality in the United Kingdom
- Healthcare and the LGBT community
- Hopkins Center for Health Disparities Solutions
- Immigrant paradox
- Inequality in disease
- Inverse care law
- Mental health inequality
- Population health
- Public health
- Publicly funded health care
- Single-payer healthcare
- Social determinants of health
- Social determinants of health in poverty
- Unnatural Causes: Is Inequality Making Us Sick?
- Weathering hypothesis
- Single-parent children and educational attainment
