= Single-parent children and educational attainment =

Children growing up in single-parent families tend to have lower average educational attainment compared to children raised in nuclear families. Single-parent families are more likely to be in a lower socioeconomic class than coupled-parent families. Low income children have a lack of access to resources performing lower than children from higher socioeconomic backgrounds and they are less likely to attend higher education.

In single-parent households where a parent has died, educational status tends to stay the same as when it was a two-parent household. In households where there is a single-parent due to divorce, there are more negative trends relating to the education of children. The large number of single-parent families contributes to the disparities in opportunities for children, which affect their life outcomes. There are other socioeconomic factors that play a role in children's academic success including racial group, parents' education level, and income.

The number of children growing up in single-parent households has risen over the last one hundred years. In the US, UK, Sweden, and Ireland, 25% of households with children were single-parent households. The majority of single-families are headed by women and 12% of single-parent families were headed by men in the Organization for Economic Co-operation and Development (OECD) countries. Since 2010, the percentage of children in single-parent households has been consistently around 35%.

== History ==
In 1980, 77% of children in the United States lived with parents who were married. By 2019, this percentage had decreased to 63%. During this period, roughly one in four children were being raised by a single parent, most often, a mother.

The prevalence of single motherhood in the United States has increased primarily due to non-marital births; these are more common among socioeconomically disadvantaged women. The likelihood of children living with a single mother varies by maternal education level. Among children whose mothers have a college degree, 12% reside in single-mother households. For children whose mothers attended college but did not receive a degree, 29% reside in single-parent households and 30% of children whose mothers did not complete high school live in single-parent households. Approximately 54% of Black children live with a single mother, compared to 15% of White children. Black children whose mothers have a college degree are as likely to live with a single mother as children of other racial groups whose mothers did not complete high school.

The increase in single-parent families have been associated with greater economic instability among families in the United States, contributing to the widening disparities in opportunities and outcomes for children.

== Single-parent households' socioeconomic status ==
Single parenthood is associated with various socioeconomic disadvantages, including an elevated risk of poverty. Single parents may encounter challenges in the labor market, with gender disparities playing a role. Employment is a key factor in economic well-being, providing financial stability, personal identity, and opportunities for skill development. Since women head the majority of single-parent households, they are more likely to earn lower wages, have less work experience, and face restricted career advancement opportunities. Financial constraints contribute to higher rates of material deprivation for children among single parents compared to coupled parents. They are also more likely to face social stigma due to perceptions related to welfare dependency. Housing conditions for single parents are often characterized by smaller living spaces due to the financial burden of housing costs.

The socioeconomic background of parents is seen as one of the impactful factors in children's lives and education. Children raised in single-parent households, on average, experience lower emotional well-being, face cognitive development challenges, and tend to perform less well academically compared to their peers from two-parent households.

== Academic studies ==
Studies have shown that living with one parent can impact a child's education attainment. Higher test scores and educational aspirations were found from children living with two parents. A review of 47 studies of family structures found that children from nuclear families were more likely to graduate and earn a degree. For single parent households, the general consensus is that children from single-mother and single-father families do not show significant differences in educational outcomes. A study comparing the educational outcomes of children of identical twins - where one twin experienced divorce and the other did not - found reduced educational attainment by one-fourth of a year from children who experienced parental divorce before the age of 16, on average.

The OECD report in 2009 compared how reading grades from students in single-parent families (SSPF) compared with grades from students living in other families in countries throughout the world. The report found that the average reading grade was 16% lower for SSPF than other students. SSPFs in Qatar scored an average grade that was 80% lower than other students, while SSPFs in Kazakhstan scored 20% higher grades than their classmates. SSPFs in the USA performed about 45% lower than their classmates, while students in Ireland performed at about 25% lower; SSPFs in the UK, Canada, Australia and New Zealand were close to the average of 16% lower.

The age of SSPFs has also been taken into consideration, with a 2019 study finding that SSPFs aged seven years or younger will have a lower education attainment than those who were raised by both parents until the age of seven. The 2009 OECD report looked at the socioeconomic backgrounds of SSPFs and found 8 countries where SSPFs perform better at reading than their classmates after their backgrounds are taken into consideration. A 2019 report showed that changes in economic status still accounted for changes in SSPF educational attainment.

A 2015 study by Amato, Patterson, and Beattie examined the relationship between single-parent households and children’s educational achievement in the United States from 1990 to 2011. Children living without either parent demonstrated a disadvantage in academic performance. Single-parent households were linked with a slight decline in the percentage of students scoring at the highest proficiency levels in mathematics. The study identified that higher maternal education levels were associated with improved academic outcomes.

== Effects of educational attainment on health outcomes ==
Much of what children learn about in school impacts their ability to obtain information relating to their health. Skills, like evaluating internet sources, are taught in schools which cause children to engage in critical thinking and there is evidence suggesting this aids in health literacy. Education is also a factor in securing enough income to obtain a level of safety and a healthier lifestyle. With an accumulation of wealth, families are more likely to spend money to improve or monitor health. In the Office of Disease Prevention and Health Promotion's National Action Plan to Improve Health Literacy, it is recommended that parents are included in providing information on health related issues for their children alongside educators.

With educational attainment, there are also educational experiences which can be effected generationally, specifically when linked to parental socioeconomic status (SES). Children with parents in a lower SES are less likely to obtain a degree or attend an institute for higher education. The increase in single-parent families has been associated with socioeconomic inequalities, which correlates with health disparities. In the past decades, the average health of the educated groups within the US population has improved and health and longevity of those less educated are currently worsening.

Education has been associated with improved health outcomes as it enhances an individual's knowledge, skill, reasoning, and effectiveness. Many studies have demonstrated a health-education gradient demonstrating how increased levels of educational attainment are linked to better health and longer life expectancy. In their 1973 book, Kitagawa and Hauser found disparities in mortality rates by education level in the United States, which have been supported by numerous studies. Individuals with lower levels of education tend to report poorer general health, higher rates of chronic conditions, and greater levels of functional limitations and disability.

== See also ==
- Health Equity
- Educational inequality
