= Biological inequity =

Biological inequity, also known as biological inequality, refers to the "systematic, unfair, and avoidable stress-related biological differences which increase risk of disease, observed between social groups of a population". The term developed by Centric Lab aims to unify societal factors with the biological underpinnings of health inequities – the unfair and avoidable differences in health status and risks between social groups of a population — such that these inequalities can be investigated in a holistic manner.

== Mechanism ==
Biological inequity posits that health inequity in urban populations is a result of structurally racist processes executed through the built environment. Specifically, particular social groups are disproportionately exposed to physical and psychosocial stressors in the urban environment. For example, studies show Black, Asian, and Minority Ethnic (BAME) groups inhabit more deprived and environmentally polluted neighbourhoods. Through this, these groups experience prolonged exposure to physical (e.g., air pollution) and psychosocial (e.g., discrimination) stressors resulting in chronic stress. Chronic stress increases the individuals 'allostatic load' level – which refers to the wear and tear of stress-related biological systems e.g., neuroendocrine, metabolic, immune systems. In turn, these stress-related biological differences increase the risk of disease and poorer health outcomes.

== Measures and predictors of biological inequity ==
Measures have been developed to quantify biological inequity by combining physical (e.g., air pollution, noise pollution, light pollution) and psychosocial factors (e.g., deprivation) that define the phenomena, such as the 'Biological Inequity Index.

As a phenomenon, biological inequity is situated at the intersection between poverty, structural racism, and place. As such, biological inequity as expressed through allostatic load is correlated with factors such as socioeconomic status, ethnic and racial grouping, and urban factors e.g., green space, and housing quality.

== Health outcomes ==
Biological inequity increases the risk of disease and poor health outcomes for a social group through;

1. disproportionate exposure to the cause(s) of the disease brought about by direct exposure to physical and/or psychosocial stressors, or
2. greater adverse effects of the cause(s) of a disease brought about from accumulated stress-related biological differences, i.e., higher levels of allostatic load.

=== Non-communicable diseases ===
Obesity has been linked to biological inequity factors such as air pollution and psychosocial stress. Similar findings have shown diabetes to be associated with physical and psychosocial stressors.

=== Mental health ===
Mental health conditions such as depression, anxiety have been linked to biological inequity factors such as air pollution, noise pollution and area deprivation

=== Infectious disease ===
Measures of Biological inequity such as psychosocial stress and environmental stress have been shown to correlate with COVID-19 mortality rates, suggesting possible increased exposure to COVID-19 or increased vulnerability to the virus.
