= Inequality in disease =

Overview article

Inequality in disease refers to the unequal distribution or burden of disease among a population. This differs from the related topic of health disparities, which requires an inequality in disease that is linked to, at least in part, systemic differences faced by socially and economically disadvantaged groups. For example, an increased prevalence of soft tissue injuries among professional athletes in comparison to the rest of the population would be considered inequality in disease and not a health disparity, as this difference could not be attributed to social or economic disadvantages. Many variations in health outcomes in the United States can be seen across several social characteristics, such as gender, race, socioeconomic status, the environment, and educational attainment as well as in the intersections between these identities.

== Gender ==
First noted in the late 19th century, female life expectancy is generally greater than that of males. This is partially explained by biological factors. For instance, there is a cross-cultural trend that male fetal mortality rates are higher than female fetal mortality rates. Additionally, estrogen decreases the risk of females acquiring heart disease by lowering the amount of cholesterol in the blood, while testosterone suppresses the immune system in males and puts them at risk for acquiring serious illnesses. However, biological differences do not fully account for the large gender gap in the health outcomes of men and women. Social factors play a large role in gender disparities in health.

One of the main factors that contributes to the decreased life expectancy of males is their propensity to engage in risk-taking behaviors. Some commonly cited examples include heavy drinking, illicit drug use, violence, drunk driving, not wearing helmets, and smoking. These behaviors contribute to injuries that may lead to premature death in males. In particular, the effect of risk-taking behavior on health is especially visible in the case of smoking. As smoking rates have fallen in the United States overall, less men engage in this behavior and the life expectancy gap between men and women has slightly decreased as a result.

The behaviour of men and women also vary in regards to diet and exercise, leading to differential health outcomes . On average, men exercise more than women, but their diet is less nutritious. Consequently, men are more likely to be overweight, while women are at greater risk for obesity. Exposure to violence is another social factor that has an influence on health. In general, women have a higher likelihood of experiencing sexual and intimate partner violence, while men are twice as likely to die from suicide or homicide.

Markedly, the impact of gender on health becomes especially salient in different socioeconomic contexts. In the United States, there is a large economic gender inequality with many economically disadvantaged women occupying much fewer positions of power than men. According to the Panel Study of Income Dynamics, "among adults with the strongest attachment to the labor force, only 9.6% of women earned more than $50,000 annually, compared with 44.5% of men." This gendered economic inequality is partly responsible for the gender-health paradox: the general trend that women live longer than men, but experience a greater degree of non-life-threatening chronic illnesses over the course of a lifetime. A low socioeconomic status in women contributes to feelings of a lack of personal control over the events in their lives, increased stress, and low self-esteem. Perpetual states of stress inflict damage on the bodies and minds of women, placing them at risk for physical ailments, such as heart disease and arthritis, as well mental health disorders, such as depression.

Another significant social factor is that men and women deal with their illnesses in different ways. Women generally have strong support networks and are able to rely on others for emotional support, with the potential to improve their states of health. In contrast, men are less likely to have strong support networks, they have fewer doctor visits, and often cope with their illnesses on their own. Also, men and women express pain in different ways. Researchers have observed that women openly express feelings of pain, while men are more reserved in this regard and prefer to appear tough even when they experience severe mental or physical suffering. This finding suggests that this is due to socialization processes. Women are taught to be submissive and emotional, while men are taught to be strong, powerful figures that do not show their emotions. The social stigma associated with expressions of pain prevents men from admitting their suffering to others, making it more difficult to overcome the pain.

Moreover, neighborhood effects have a greater influence on women than men. For instance, research findings suggest that women living in impoverished neighborhoods are more likely to experience obesity, while this effect is not as strong for men. The physical environment also generally impacts a woman's self-rated health. This effect can be explained by the fact that women spend more time at home than their male counterparts, as a result of higher unemployment rates, and therefore may be more exposed to negative environmental characteristics that take a toll on their health.

Finally, gender effects also vary with race, ethnicity, and nativity status. Notably, Christy Erving conducted a study in which she examined the gender differences in the health profiles of African Americans and Caribbean blacks (immigrants and U.S. born). One of the findings from this research is that on average, African American women report lower self-rated measures of health, worse physical health, and were more likely to experience severe chronic illnesses than men. This finding contradicts the gender-health paradox in the sense that researchers would expect morbidity rates to be higher for women, but less of the illnesses that they acquire should be debilitating. In contrast, the opposite trend is observed for U.S. born Caribbean blacks, with men more likely to experience chronic, life-threatening illnesses than women. The health outcomes of Caribbean black immigrants are somewhere in-between the health outcomes of U.S. born Caribbean blacks and African Americans, wherein the females have a lower value of self-reported health but experience equal rates of life-threatening, chronic disease as men. This data illustrates that even within one racial category, there can be stark gender differences in health on the basis of social differences within the groups that compose the race.

== Race ==
Studies have shown that individuals who are racially and ethnically stigmatized, not just in the U.S., but globally as well, experience health issues such as mental and physical illness and in some cases even death, at higher rates than the average individual. There has been some controversy around "race" being a determinant of disease and health issues since there are unmeasured forms of background history that are potential factors in this research. Geographical origins and the types of environments individual races were exposed to are significant contributors to the health of a certain race, especially when the environment they are in now is not the same as the one their race originates from geographically.

Along with these factors, physical, psychological, social, and chemical environments are all included and accounted for. Including exposure over the course of one's life and through generations, and biological adaptation to these environmental exposures, including gene expression. An example of this is a study of hypertension between black people and whites. West Africans and people of West African descent levels of hypertension increased when they moved from Africa to the United States. Their levels of hypertension were twice as high as the levels of black people that were in Africa. While whites in the United States even had higher rates of hypertension than Black people in Africa, the black people in the United States rates of hypertension were higher than some predominately white populations in Europe. Again, this proves that when a race is taken out of their original geographic environment, they are more prone to disease and illness, because their genetic make-up was made for a specific type of environment.

Transitioning from the environmental aspect of race and disease, there is a direct correlation between race and socioeconomic status which contributes to racial disparities in health. When it comes to death rates from heart disease, the rate is about twice as high for black men vs. white men. Now, death rates from heart disease are lower for both black and white women compared to their male counterparts, but the patterns of racial disparities and education disparities for women are similar to that of the men. Death from heart disease is about three times as higher for black women than white women. For both black men and women, racial differences in deaths from heart disease at every level of education is evident, with the racial gap being larger at the higher levels of education than at the lowest levels. There are a number of reasons why race matters in terms of health after socioeconomic status has been accounted for. For one, health is affected by adversity early on in one's life, such as traumatic stress, poverty, and abuse. These factors affect the physical and mental health of an individual. As we know, most of the people living in poverty in the United States are minorities, specifically African Americans, so unfortunately there is no surprise that they are the individuals with so many health issues.

Continuously, race is relevant to health issues, because of the non-equivalence of socioeconomic status indicators across racial groups. At the same level of education, minorities (black people and non-white Hispanic people) receive less income than their Anglo-white counterparts, as well as have less wealth and purchasing power. Namely, one of the biggest reasons that race matters in terms of health is due to racism. Both personal and institutionalized racism are very prominent in today's society, maybe not as blunt and easy to notice in comparison to the past, but it still exists. Certain residential segregation by race, such as redlining, has created very distinct racial differences in terms of education, employment, and opportunities. Opportunities such as access to good healthcare/medical care. Institutional and cultural racism can even harm minorities health through stereotypes and prejudices, which contributes to socioeconomic mobility and can reduce and limit resources and opportunities required for a healthy lifestyle.

Socioeconomic status is only one part of racial disparities in health that reflect larger social inequalities in society. Racism is a system that combines with, and sometimes changes, socioeconomic status to influence health, and race still matters for health when socioeconomic status is considered.

== Socioeconomic status ==
Socioeconomic status is a multidimensional classification, often defined using an individual's income and level of education. Other related metrics can round out this definition; for example, in a 2006 study by authors Cox, McKevitt, Rudd and Wolfe, further categories included "occupation, home and goods ownership, and area-based deprivation indices" in their determination of status.

Income inequality has risen rapidly in the United States, pushing greater amounts of the population into positions of lower socioeconomic status. A study published in 1993 examined Americans who had died between May and August 1960, and paired the mortality information with income, education and occupation data for each person. The work found an inverse correlation between socioeconomic status and mortality rate, as well as an increasing strength of this pattern and its reflection of the growth of income inequality in the United States.

These findings, although concerned with total mortality of any cause, reflect a similar relationship between socioeconomic status and disease incidence or death in the United States. Disease composes a very significant portion of U.S. mortality; as of May 2017, 6 out of 7 of the leading causes of death in America are non-communicable diseases, including heart disease, cancer, lower respiratory diseases, and cerebrovascular diseases (stroke). Indeed, these diseases have been seen to disproportionately affect the socioeconomically disadvantaged, albeit to different degrees and with differing magnitude. Mortality rates associated with cardiovascular disease (CVD), including coronary heart disease (CHD) and stroke, were assessed for individuals across areas of differing income and income inequality. The authors found that the mortality rates for each of the three respective diseases were greater by a factor of 1.36, 1.26, and 1.60, in areas of higher inequality compared to lower inequality areas of similar income. Across areas of differing income and constant income inequality, the rate of death due to CVD, CHD and stroke was increased by a factor of 1.27, 1.15, and 1.33 in the lower income areas. These trends across two measures of variation in socioeconomic status reflect the complexity and depth of the relationship between disease and economic standing. The authors are careful to state that while these patterns exist, they are not sufficiently described as related by cause and effect. While correlating, health and status have arisen in the U.S. from interrelated forces that may intricately accumulate or negate one another due to specific historical contexts.

As this lack of cause and effect simplicity indicates, exactly where disease-related health inequality arises is murky, and multiple factors likely contribute. Important to an examination of disease and health in the context of a complicated classification like socioeconomic status is the degree to which these measures are tied up with mechanisms that are dependent upon the individual, and those that are regionally variant. In the aforementioned 2006 study, the authors define individualized factors within three categories, "material (eg, income, possessions, environment), behavioural (eg, diet, smoking, exercise) and psychosocial (eg, perceived inequality, stress)", and provide two categories for external, regionally varying factors, "environmental influences (such as provision of and access to services) and psychosocial influences (such as social support)." The interactive and compounding nature of these forces can shape and be shaped by socioeconomic status, presenting a challenge to researchers to tease apart the intersecting factors of health and status. In the 2006 study, authors examined the specific drivers of the correlation between stroke occurrence and socioeconomic status. Identifying more nuanced and interlocking factors, they cited risk behaviors, early life influences, and access to care as tied to socioeconomic status and thus health inequality.

Inequality in disease is intricately tangled up with stratification of social class and economic status in the United States. Correlations, often disease-dependent, between health and socioeconomic attainment have been demonstrated in numerous studies for numerous diseases. The causes of these correlations are interlocking and often related to factors varying between regions and individuals, and design of future studies concerning inequality in disease require careful thought to the multifaceted driving mechanisms of social inequality.

== Environment ==
The neighbourhood and areas people live in, as well as their occupation, make up the environment in which they exist. People living in poverty stricken neighborhoods are at a greater risk for heart disease, possibly because the supermarkets in their area do not sell healthy foods and there is increased availability of stores selling alcohol and tobacco than in more affluent parts of town. People living in rural areas are also more susceptible to heart disease, as well. An agriculturally based diet rich in fat and cholesterol, combined with an isolated environment in which there is limited access to health care and ways to distribute information probably creates a pattern in which people living in rural environments have higher levels of heart disease. Occupational cancer is one way in which the environment one works in can increase their rate of disease. Employees exposed to smoke, asbestos, diesel fumes, paint, and chemicals in factories can develop cancer from their workplace. All of these jobs tend to be low-paying and typically held by low income individuals. The decreased amount of healthy food in stores located in low-income areas also contributes to the increased rates of diabetes for persons living in those neighborhoods. One of the best examples of this can be seen by observing the city of Jacksonville, Florida.

=== Food deserts in urban Jacksonville ===
In Jacksonville, Florida it is hard to find groceries stores around the area because it is surrounded by fats, sugar, and high in cholesterol markets. In Duval County, there are 177,000 food insecure individuals such as children, families, senior citizens, and veterans that do not know when they will have a chance to have another meal again. Nearly 60 percent of the food that is consumed in Duval County is processed. To combat this, agencies helped distribute food and they averaged 12.3 million meals over eight counties in Northern Florida. In Duval alone, 3.5 million meals were handed out to families. The image below shows all of the hunger-relief partner agencies located within Jacksonville's food deserts that get food from Feeding Northeast Florida. In all Feeding Northeast Florida provided 4.2 million pounds of food to agencies in food deserts. These numbers were stats recorded in 2016.

=== Water pollution ===
Just like Flint, Jacksonville had a water crisis and found 23 different chemicals in its water supply. It was so bad that Jacksonville was labeled top 10 in worst water in the nation. They stood at number 10 because of the 23 different chemicals. The chemicals that were most commonly found in the water in high volumes were trihalomethanes, which is made up of four different cleaning byproducts, such as chloroform. Trihalomethanes are confirmed to be carcinogenic. Throughout the five-year testing period, unsafe levels of trihalomethanes were found during the 32 months of testing, and levels that are considered illegal by the EPA were found in 12 of those months. In one of the testing periods the trihalomethanes were found at twice the EPA legal limit. Other chemicals, such as lead and arsenic that can cause health problems to people, were also found in the drinking water.

Another way that water pollution is damaged is from nutrient overload. Nutrient overload is caused by manure and fertilizers, stormwater runoff, and wastewater treatment plants. This occurs in a lot of Florida rivers and the rivers are contained with blue green algae that feed on all those nutrients. All the waste that is dumped into the rivers gets fed on by other plants and animals that release toxins in the area, which makes everything surrounded by it a deadly toxin as well. The toxins that are dumped into the rivers can cause discoloration in the rivers to make a dark blue and green color. By looking at the river most people can tell how dangerous and harmful it is to be around it. If the water were to somehow get into water companies people can receive serious harm from drinking and bathing with this water.

== Education ==
Education level is an influential predictor of socioeconomic status. In 2022, among full-time workers over the age of 25 in the United States, those without a high school diploma earned a median weekly income of $682. Median weekly income among these workers increased with each advancement in educational level. High school graduates earned a median of $853, college graduates earned $1,432, and doctorate degrees earned $2,083 respectively. Furthermore, in 2022, those without high school degrees held the highest unemployment rate out of the educational subgroups. This correlation between increased income and employment opportunity informs differences in disease burden, especially in the United States. On average, individuals with higher financial security can obtain higher-quality health insurance and choose a better living environment. Both of these factors support better health outcomes as compared to those with lower financial stability.

Educational attainment is also a predictor of how likely an individual is to engage in risky, possibly disease-causing, behaviors. In terms of smoking, which directly correlates to an increased risk for diseases like lung cancer, education is an important determining factor in the likelihood of an individual to smoke. As of 2009–10, 35 percent of adults who did not graduate high school were smokers, compared to 30 percent of high school graduates and just 13 percent of college graduates. High school graduates also smoked more packs, on average, each year than smokers who had graduated from college. Furthermore, individuals with a high school degree or less were 30% less likely to abstain from smoking for at least 3 months during their time as a regular smoker Other studies have found that binge drinking is higher among those with college degrees, implying that binge drinking is a habitat developed by many during the college years.

Unhealthy dietary habits can also directly lead to diseases such as heart disease, hypertension, and type-2 diabetes. One of the leading causes of unhealthy eating habits is a lack of access to grocery stores, creating so called "food deserts." Studies have found that immediate access to a grocery store (within 1.5 mile radius) was 1.4 times less likely in areas where only 27%, or less, of the population was college graduates. The negative effects of these food deserts are exacerbated by the fact that impoverished neighborhoods also had an oversupply of liquor store, fast food restaurants, and convenience stores.

One significant risk for sexually active individuals is that of sexually transmitted diseases and infections. While studies have found that the correlation between education and carrying these is relatively low on average (and even less so for certain subsets such as Black women), there is a strong correlation between education and other risky sexual behaviors. Those with only a high school degree or less were significantly more likely to engage in risky practices such as early sexual initiation, sexual activity with those who use "shooting" street drugs such as heroin, and even prostitution. In addition, those with less education were also less likely to practice some safe sex practices such as condom use.

Studies have also found that adults with higher educational achievement were more likely to lead healthier lives. Intake of key nutrients such as Vitamins A and C, potassium, and calcium was positively correlated with education level. This is a critical statistic because those nutrients, such as Vitamin C, are critical in helping the body fight diseases and infections. There was also a correlation between education and exercise habits. A 2010 study found that while 85% of college graduates stated they exercised in the last month, only 68% of high school graduates and 61% of non-high school graduates said the same. Because exercise is so crucial to preventing diseases like hypertension and type 2 diabetes, this stark distinction between exercise habitats can have significant effects. By 2011, 15% of high school (or less) graduates had diabetes, compared to just 7% of college graduates.

Arguably the best way of seeing the true effects of education in the inequality of disease is to examine mortality levels, as Heart Disease, Cancer, and Lower Respiratory Diseases are the top three killers, respectively, of Americans every year. By age 25, if an individual does not have at least a high school degree, they will die an average of 9 years earlier than an otherwise similar college graduate. A different national study found that individuals with only bachelor's degrees were 26% more likely to die in the next 5 years than individuals of the same age with professional degrees such as a master's. Even more stark, Americans without a high school degree were almost twice as likely to die than those with a professional degree in the study's 5 year follow-up period.

== Intersectionality ==
Individuals often have multiple social identities (gender, sexuality, race, disability status, etc), which, when taken into account in the context of intersectionality, can affect disease distribution in ways that looking at any single identity cannot. The interplay of each of these factors creates lived experiences and challenges unique to these individuals, especially among those from multiple historically disadvantaged groups. For example, LGBTQ+ people of color face different obstacles than those who identify as LGBTQ+, but not a person of color. Likewise, there are differences for those who identify as a person of color but not as LGBTQ+. This is especially prevalent when thinking about intersectionality within discrimination and the specific health challenges populations may face as a result. For instance, Black women who face discriminatory events may have an increased risk of delivering babies both early and underweight.

Previous public health literature has often lacked participation from underrepresented groups. This can be problematic when making recommendations for further research and to the general public, particularly in the context of intersectionality. One subset of the literature that illustrates this is older LGBTQ+ populations. The majority of the health disparities research in this field has been conducted on wealthier white able-bodied in comparison to the LGBTQ+ population as a whole. For this reason, less wealthy, non-white, and disabled counterparts, make up less of the literature comparatively and researchers know less about the unique disease burdens that they face. Researchers have also continued to progress towards understanding interlocking systems of oppression by both better including underrepresented subgroups in aggregating studies (i.e.. LGBTQ+ people of color) as well as conducting more studies using disaggregated data (i.e.. black bisexual women).

== See also ==
- Health equity
- Social determinants of health
- Social determinants of health in poverty
- Social determinants of obesity
- Social epidemiology
- Unnatural Causes: Is Inequality Making Us Sick?
- Hygiene hypothesis
- Diseases of affluence
- Diseases of poverty
- Public health
- Typhus § History
- Weathering hypothesis
