= Population Health Forum =

Academic forum in Seattle, Washington, USA

The Population Health Forum is a group based at University of Washington in Seattle, Washington, and composed of academics, citizens, students, and activists from around North America.

== Purpose and activities ==
Activities include development of academic curricula for middle and high schools, advocacy, and maintenance of a population health listserv.

They focus on raising awareness of the population health issue and the social determinants of health. The forum focuses on the role that economic inequality and the gap between rich and poor impact a population’s health, using the “Health Olympics” (a ranking of countries in terms of life expectancy) as a model. The group aims to question why the United States ranks 29th in terms of health while spending half the world’s healthcare bill; it suggests that economic inequality as well as social stressors and loss of social cohesion are prime factors.

== Influences ==
The ideas of the group are heavily influenced by research into the social determinants of health by social epidemiologists such as Richard G. Wilkinson and Ichiro Kawachi.

== See also ==
- Population health
- Economic inequality
- List of countries by income equality
- Poverty and Cycle of poverty
- Distribution of wealth
- Social determinants of health
- Epidemiology
- Social determinants of health in poverty

== Resources ==
- Kawachi, I and BP Kennedy. The Health of Nations: Why Inequality if Harmful to Your Health. New York: The New Press, 2002.
- Wilkinson, R. Unhealthy Societies: The Affliction of Inequality. London: Routledge, 1996.
- Wilkinson, R. The Impact of Inequality: How to Make Sick Societies Healthier. New York: The New Press, 2005.
