= Dutch Association of Mental Health and Addiction Care =

Dutch health organization

The Dutch Association of Mental Health and Addiction Care (Dutch: GGZ Nederland, Geestelijke Gezondheidszorg) is an organisation of mental health and addiction care providers in the Netherlands. It has over 100 member organisations, which in 2012 employed around 85,000 people. GGZ Nederland has about 69 staff and is based in Amersfoort.

The Association is a partner of EuroHealthNet's "PHASE" project and is a member of Mental Health Europe.
