= CDoH =

CDoH may refer to:

- Commercial determinants of health, private sector activities influencing health;
- Colorado Department of Highways, former name of the Colorado Department of Transportation.
