= Social determinants of health =

Economic and social conditions that influence differences in health status

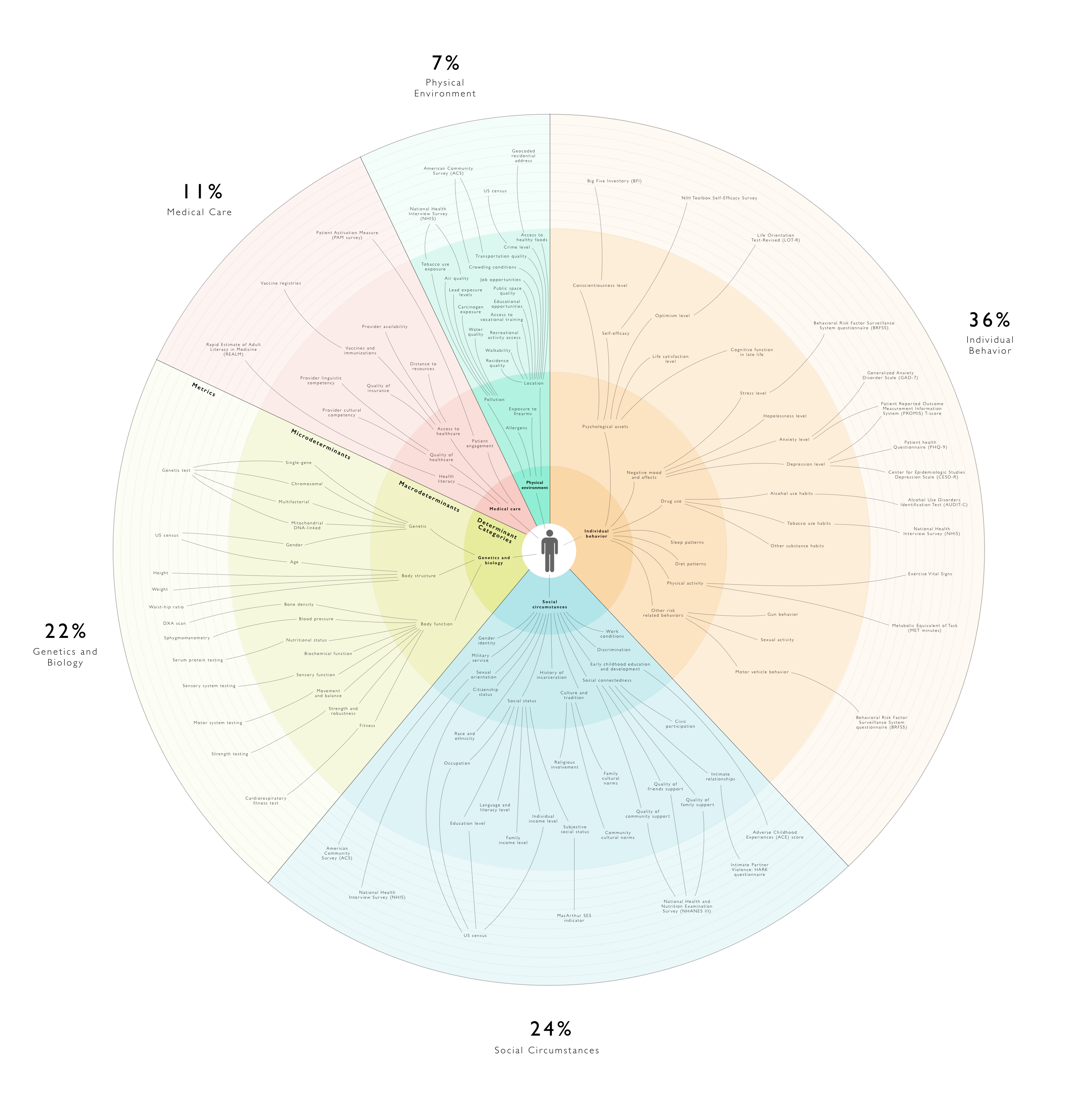
Visualization of the social determinants of health

Social determinants of health are the factors, oftentimes related to environment or status, that affect the conditions of daily life and one's health. They are the factors that determine a person's vulnerability for disease, but also their ability to gain access to care. They are commonly broken down into six categories: economic stability, education, social and community context, race and gender, health care access, and built environment. There is debate about which of these is most important.

The World Health Organization (WHO) explains that health is influenced by the "circumstances in which people are born, grow up, live, work and age, and the systems put in place to deal with illness." WHO further states that "unequal distribution of health-damaging experiences is not in any sense a 'natural' phenomenon but is the result of a toxic combination of poor social policies, unfair economic arrangements [where the already well-off and healthy become even richer and the poor who are already more likely to be ill become even poorer], and bad politics."

Social determinants of health include all non-biological factors that influence one's health and quality of life. This consists of: access to health education; community and social context; access to quality healthcare; food security; neighborhood and physical environment; and economic stability. Studies have found that more than half of a person's health is determined by social determinants rather than clinical care and genetics.

Health disparities exist in countries around the world. There are various theoretical approaches to social determinants, including the life-course perspective. Chronic stress, which is experienced more frequently by those living with adverse social and economic conditions, has been linked to poor health outcomes. Various interventions have been made to improve health conditions worldwide, although measuring the efficacy of such interventions is difficult. Social determinants are important considerations within clinical settings. Public policy has shaped and continues to shape social determinants of health.

All types of government can increase health equity in their region. Health is not always the main driver of political policy, but policies still often affect citizens' access to healthcare and health equity. One example of this indirect correlation is in trade markets. The WHO explains that, "Trade policy that actively encourages the production, trade, and consumption of foods high in fats and sugars to the detriment of fruit and vegetable production is contradictory to health policy."

Related topics are social determinants of mental health, social determinants of health in poverty, social determinants of obesity, and commercial determinants of health.

== Commonly accepted social determinants ==
The United States Centers for Disease Control and Prevention (CDC) defines social determinants of health as "life-enhancing resources". In the realm of public health, the concept of social determinants of health has emerged as a crucial framework for comprehending the myriad factors that influence an individual's well-being. While medical care and genetics play significant roles, a person's health outcomes are also profoundly shaped by their social, economic, and environmental conditions. Understanding these determinants is imperative for devising effective strategies to address health disparities and promote equitable access to healthcare. Some of the main social factors that shape one's health include socioeconomic status, education, neighborhood and physical environment, social support networks, healthcare access and quality, and economic stability.

According to 2021 findings from the Center for Migration Studies of New York, there is a strong correlation among various social determinants of health. Individuals residing in regions marked by one specific determinant often experience the impact of other determinants as well. These social determinants significantly shape health-promoting behaviors, emphasizing that achieving health equity across populations necessitates a fair distribution of these social determinants among different groups.

A commonly used model that illustrates the relationship between biological, individual, community, and societal determinants is Margaret Whitehead and Göran Dahlgren's model originally presented in 1991 and subsequently adapted by the CDC. Additionally, within the United States, Healthy People 2030 is an objective-driven framework which can guide public health practitioners and healthcare providers on how to address social determinants of health at the community level. A 2024 scoping review that evaluated the intensity and complexity of social needs interventions found limitations exist in scaling them, as the majority of studies have not made causal inferences about individual components.

These social determinants of health have gained wide usage: Income and income distribution; education; unemployment and job security; employment and working conditions; early childhood development; food insecurity; Housing; social exclusion/inclusion; social safety network; health care services; Aboriginal status; gender; race; and disability.

The list of social determinants of health can be much longer. A 2019 article by Australian scholar M. Mofizul Islam in Frontiers in Public Health identified several other social determinants, including culture and social norms; media; stigma and discrimination; immigration; religion; and access to broadband internet service. Additional research indicates that social determinants of health can be directly tied to degrees of health literacy. Unfortunately, there is no agreed-upon taxonomy or criteria as to what should be considered a social determinant of health. In the literature, a subjective assessment—whether social factors impacting health are avoidable through structural changes in policy and practice—seems to be the dominant way of identifying a social determinant of health. The increase of artificial intelligence (AI) being used in clinical care raises numerous opportunities for addressing health equity issues, yet clear models and procedures for data characteristics and design have not been embraced consistently across health systems and providers.

=== Socioeconomic status ===
At the core of the concept of social determinants of health lies socioeconomic status. This category takes into account several subcategories, including employment, housing instability, food insecurity, and poverty. There is a significant difference between health care access for those of a higher socioeconomic status and those of lower socioeconomic status. In particular, those of higher status have better access to healthcare, healthier lifestyles, and improved living conditions. Conversely, those with lower incomes often face barriers to accessing quality healthcare, nutritious food, safe housing, and educational opportunities. The stress of financial instability can also exacerbate health issues. This inconvenience can be passed down to future generations as parents teach their children these habits. Individuals from lower-income backgrounds, especially those with disabilities or chronic illnesses, are also much more susceptible to disproportionate amounts of medical debt after receiving care.

Since 1960, healthcare sustainability in the United States has been decreasing at an exponential rate. The main reasoning behind the decline is the rising cost of healthcare. A very common example of this change is the rising cost of insulin over the years. From the years 2014 to 2019, insulin prices rose by 55%, and even those with a stable medical insurance plan reported a nearly 11% increase in out-of-pocket costs. This unfair pricing of medical care leaves a large portion of the population, those who are of a lower socioeconomic status, unable to afford life saving care.

=== Education ===
Education is a major factor affecting health, and it has been found that adults with higher levels of education live longer and healthier lives than their less educated peers. Education encompasses a person's early childhood and development, completion of high school, higher education, language and literacy. The healthcare system is notoriously difficult to navigate, even for those who have completed some level of higher education, so for those with language or literacy barriers, it is almost impossible. The lack of transparency and communication between insurance companies, healthcare workers, and patients all contribute to the issue of relaying healthcare needs for these communities. Recent patterns show that education is a principal pathway to financial security, stable employment, and social mobility. However, youth in America face numerous barriers to accessing equal educational opportunities. These barriers limit access to quality health care and further widen existing health disparities.

Limited outreach and education on health within communities has also contributed to poorer health outcomes, especially in underserved communities.With the lack of foundational knowledge about positive care, disease management, or how to navigate healthcare systems, they are less likely to seek timely medical attention or adhere to treatment plans. Research on immigrant populations in rural America has found that limited health literacy about specific conditions, such as cervical cancer, served as a barrier to both screenings and vaccinations, while a lack of knowledge about the purpose, cost, and availability of services further reduced participation in preventive care. Communities also faced difficulties accessing reliable public health information, compounded by misinformation and limited internet access, further isolating them from critical health resources.

=== Neighborhood and physical environment ===
One's built environment includes access to nutritious food and diets, crime and violence rates, environmental conditions (air or water pollution), and housing quality. Following numerous studies, the impact of one's environment on their individual health is far greater than originally thought. These studies redefined the environment to include not only traditional environmental exposures, such as pollution, but also elements of the physical environment, such as walkability and access to parks/gyms, as well as the social environment, including crime rates and community support. Many communities without access to nutritious foods find the overall rates of health issues such as high cholesterol, heart disease, and diabetes to be higher.

=== Social support networks ===
Strong social connections and support systems are vital for maintaining good health. Friends, family, and community networks provide emotional support, practical assistance, and a sense of belonging, which buffer against stress and contribute to mental and physical well-being. Conversely, social isolation and lack of social support are linked to increased mortality rates and poorer health outcomes across various age groups. There are also government support networks, such as Medicare, which are supposed to provide aid to those who are elderly, disabled, or, for any reason, unable to afford care.

=== Healthcare access and quality ===
Disparities in healthcare access contribute to inequities in health outcomes among different populations. Underdeveloped countries have significantly less access to healthcare, but even in developed countries like the United States, certain areas, such as rural areas, are increasingly having difficulty accessing healthcare due to the lack of hospitals and care centers.

Legal status further compounds healthcare access and quality. In numerous countries, individuals without citizenship or documented residency status face formal and informal restrictions on accessing public health services, insurance programs, and subsidized care. In the United States, undocumented immigrants are explicitly excluded from health insurance under the Affordable Care Act, while policies across the European Union range from denying all access to providing only limited emergency care. Beyond legal restrictions, undocumented individuals frequently encounter more discrimination in practice, lack of financial resources, and an increases fear of deportation has been identified as one of the most significant barriers, leading many to avoid care entirely or delay seeking treatment until conditions become critical. All of these facets within ones legal status creates a perpetuating cycles of poor health within already marginalized communities.

=== Economic stability ===
Financial stability plays a pivotal role in shaping health outcomes. Stable employment, living wages, and social safety nets contribute to better physical and mental health by reducing stress, enabling access to healthcare, and facilitating healthy lifestyle choices. Conversely, economic instability, unemployment, and poverty are associated with higher rates of chronic diseases, mental health disorders, and overall poorer health status. According to the Child Welfare League of America (CWLA), economic stability is described as the ability to obtain the resources necessary for one's life and well-being. Programs such as Medicare are made to help these individuals with the expenses, but they often fall short of the job.

=== Gender ===
The World Health Organization (WHO) has defined health as "a state of complete physical, mental, and social well-being and not merely the absence of disease or infirmity." Identified by the 2012 World Development Report as one of two key human capital endowments, health can influence an individual's ability to reach his or her full potential in society. Yet while gender equality has made the most progress in areas such as education and labor force participation, health inequality between men and women continues to harm many societies to this day.

While both males and females face health disparities, women have historically experienced a disproportionate amount of health inequity. This stems from the fact that many cultural ideologies and practices have created a structured patriarchal society where women's experiences are discredited. Additionally, women are typically restricted from receiving certain opportunities such as education and paid labor that can help improve their accessibility to better health care resources. Females are also frequently underrepresented or excluded from mixed-sex clinical trials and therefore subjected to physician bias in diagnosis and treatment.

Transgender and non-binary individuals also experience greater health disparities in comparison to their cisgender counterparts. Throughout history, transgender and non-binary (TGNB) populations have been subject to discrimination, marginalization, and violence, with limited legal representation and protections in place to support them. These existing sociopolitical conditions have created a series of psychosocial challenges for TGNB individuals as they attempt to access quality healthcare services.

Other social determinants of health also disproportionately affect transgender and non-binary individuals. In the United States, the LGBTQ community faces greater economic insecurity compared to their cisgender counterparts, with higher overall poverty rates, particularly among transgender people. Mental health struggles have also unduly burdened LGBTQ-identifying individuals including elevated rates of suicide, depression, and other mental health disorders. These challenges, often driven by experiences with discrimination, frequently go unaddressed by the healthcare system, despite the community's heightened need for these critical health services.

Even when these marginalized groups seek out access to healthcare services, they can still be met with outdated cultures and practices. Most medical schools still teach using a binary framework for gender, ignoring the complexities and diversity among their patients' identities. There remains a significant gap in health research and resources catered towards non-cisgender populations.

=== Race ===
Race and health refers to how being identified with a specific race influences health. In the United States, race is a complex concept that has changed across chronological eras and depends on both self-identification and social recognition. In the study of race and health, some American scientists organize people in racial categories depending on different factors such as: phenotype, ancestry, social identity, genetic makeup and lived experience. Race and ethnicity often remain undifferentiated in American health research.

Differences in health status, health outcomes, life expectancy, and many other indicators of health in different racial and ethnic groups are well documented. Epidemiological data indicate that American racial groups are unequally affected by diseases, in terms of morbidity and mortality. Some individuals in certain racial groups receive less care, have less access to resources, and live shorter lives in general. Overall, racial health disparities appear to be rooted in social disadvantages associated with race such as implicit stereotyping and average differences in socioeconomic status.

According to the U.S. Centers for Disease Control and Prevention, health disparities are defined as "preventable differences in the burden of disease, injury, violence, or opportunities to achieve optimal health that are experienced by socially disadvantaged populations" and are intrinsically related to the "historical and current unequal distribution of social, political, economic and environmental resources".

The relationship between race and health has been studied from multidisciplinary perspectives, with increasing focus on how racism influences health disparities, and how environmental and physiological factors respond to one another and to genetics. In the United States, research highlights a need for more race-conscious approaches in addressing social determinants, as current social needs interventions show limited adaptation to racial and ethnic disparities.

=== Disability ===
Disabled people face health disparities, including a shortened life expectancy and higher rates of preventable chronic conditions. Research has found that female patients with disabilities have more infrequent mammograms as opposed to their nondisabled counterparts, leading to breast cancer being detected at later stages. The disabled population tends to have less access to primary and preventive care. People with disabilities face barriers to healthcare access due to many factors including inaccessible healthcare providers, steeper healthcare costs, and bias among healthcare providers.

Healthcare settings may not always be physically accessible to patients with mobility issues, due to transportation barriers or inaccessible physical spaces. Additionally, medical equipment is not always designed with disabled people in mind. While in the United States, there are federal laws in place, including the Americans with Disabilities Act (ADA), to ensure accessibility in healthcare settings, these laws are not always properly enforced due to issues with bureaucracy. Health expenditures for people with disabilities tend to be higher, feeding into economic barriers to care. These high costs can prevent the disabled population from getting their healthcare needs met.

Bias within the healthcare industry also contributes to patients with disabilities not getting adequate care. Certain disabilities can make it harder for patients to communicate their symptoms and needs with healthcare providers. People with intellectual disabilities have also reported facing bias from healthcare providers. Providers may have implicit biases against people with disabilities, leading to them overlooking their patients with disabilities' needs. Since many people with disabilities require extra care for their disabilities and often have long-standing relationships with their providers, they might fear negative repercussions when speaking up about instances of bias. All of these disparities lead to more negative outcomes for people with disabilities.

=== Work ===
Work is a defined social determinant of health, meaning that the conditions at work are a key factor in determining an individual's health. This was demonstrated notably during the COVID-19 pandemic when members of the essential workforce were exposed to a much higher risk of the disease by the necessity of being at work. Other examples include the relatively higher risk of injury in construction jobs or the relatively higher risk of toxic substances in many industrial jobs.

Because many high-risk jobs are essential to society, it is important to implement policies that mitigate the inequities faced by these workers. A "good job" is defined by the CDC as one that is safe and healthy, provides sufficient income and benefits, allows for work-life balance, offers employment security, considers employees' voices in decision-making, offers opportunities to gain skills, and fosters positive employment-related relationships.

=== Ongoing debates ===
Steven H. Woolf of the Virginia Commonwealth University Center on Human Needs states: "The degree to which social conditions affect health is illustrated by the association between education and mortality rates." Reports in 2005 revealed the mortality rate was 206.3 per 100,000 for adults aged 25 to 64 years with little education beyond high school, but was twice as great (477.6 per 100,000) for those with only a high school education and three times as great (650.4 per 100,000) for those less educated. Based on the data collected, the social conditions such as education, income, and race were dependent on one another, but these social conditions also apply to independent health influences.

Marmot and Bell of the University College London found that in wealthy countries, income and mortality are correlated as a marker of relative position within society, and this relative position is related to social conditions that are important for health including good early childhood development, access to high quality education, rewarding work with some degree of autonomy, decent housing, and a clean and safe living environment. The social conditions of autonomy, control, and empowerment are important influences on health and disease, and individuals who lack social participation and control over their lives are at a greater risk for heart disease and mental illness.

Early childhood development can be promoted or disrupted as a result of the social and environmental factors affecting the mother while the child is still in the womb. Janet Currie's research finds that women in New York City receiving assistance from the Special Supplemental Nutrition Program for Women, Infants, and Children (WIC), in comparison to their previous or future childbirth, are 5.6% less likely to give birth to an underweight child, an indication that a child will have better short term, and long term physical, and cognitive development.

Several other social determinants are related to health outcomes and public policy, and are easily understood by the public to impact health. They tend to cluster together – for example, those living in poverty experience a number of negative health determinants.

== International health inequalities ==
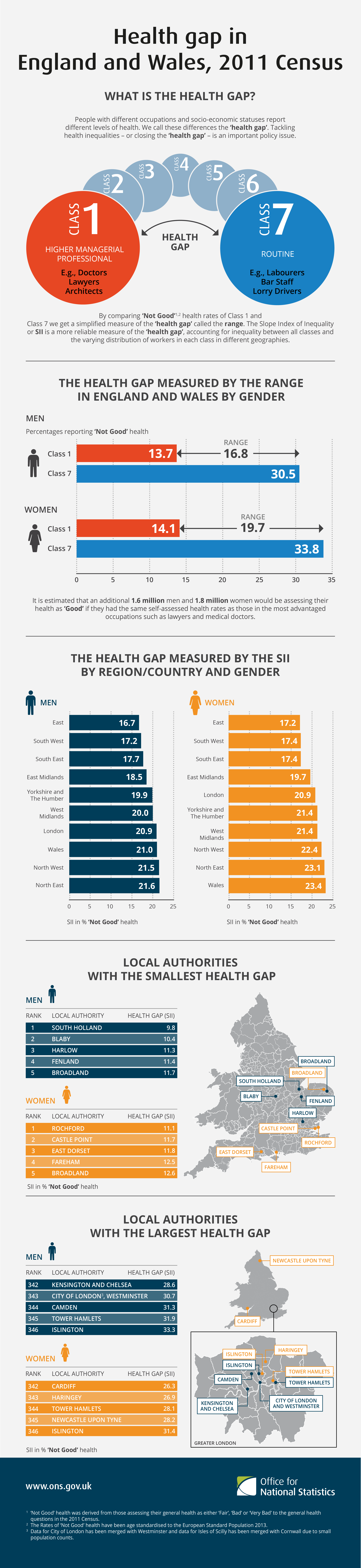
Health gap in England and Wales, 2011 Census

Even in the wealthiest countries, there are health inequalities between the rich and the poor. Researchers Labonte and Schrecker from the Department of Epidemiology and Community Medicine at the University of Ottawa emphasize that globalization is key to understanding the social determinants of health, and as Bushra (2011) posits, the impacts of globalization are unequal. Globalization has caused an uneven distribution of wealth and power both within and across national borders, and where and in what situation a person is born has an enormous impact on their health outcomes. The Organization for Economic Cooperation and Development found significant differences among developed nations in health status indicators such as life expectancy, infant mortality, incidence of disease, and death from injuries. Migrants and their family members also experience significant negatives health impacts.

These inequalities may exist in the context of the health care system, or in broader social approaches. According to the WHO's Commission on Social Determinants of Health, access to health care is essential for equitable health, and it argued that health care should be a common good rather than a commercial product. However, there is substantial variation in health care systems and coverage from country to country. The commission also calls for government action on such things as access to clean water and safe, equitable working conditions, and it notes that dangerous working conditions exist even in some wealthy countries. In the Rio Political Declaration on Social Determinants of Health, several key areas of action were identified to address inequalities, including promotion of participatory policy-making processes, strengthening global governance and collaboration, and encouraging developed countries to reach a target of 0.7% of gross national product (GNP) for official development assistance.

Recent Trends

In recent years, the recognition of social determinants of health has had a growing impact on healthcare and they now account for more variation in health outcomes than medical care itself. Following this change, that the magnitude of the unequal distribution of health-outcomes is no longer singularly biologically determined but rather determined by the condition's one is exposed to through their environment and status. This has been particularly harmful to marginalized groups, such as the elderly, disabled, or chronically ill. These groups rely on the American healthcare system more than the average population yet tend to have limited access due to issues like healthcare affordability which is largely affected by social determinants of health.

== Healthcare Technology ==
According to the World Health Organization, health technologies "include medicines, medical devices, assistive technologies, techniques and procedures developed to solve health problems and improve the quality of life." Used in almost every aspect of the healthcare process, medical technologies encompass everything from simple everyday tools to advanced surgical robotics. While health technologies are designed to enhance healthcare provider's ability to address the needs of patients, they can also exacerbate health disparities.

=== Medical Devices ===
Medical devices can be built within biased frameworks, creating unequal standards of care that are influenced by social determinants. The unequal performance of medical devices often stems from the lack of testing on a diverse range of populations. This one-size-fits-all approach assumes the social identity of the user, and these devices might perform worse on people whose identity does not align with this assumption.

This bias is evident in the case of pulse oximetry. A pulse oximeter is a device that uses infrared light to measure blood oxygen content. Pulse oximeters have been found to consistently overestimate the blood oxygen levels in patients with darker skin tones, which can lead to a greater risk of undiagnosed hypoxemia. The design of this device failed to account for variations in skin color, inadvertently amplifying racial inequalities in healthcare.

Accounting for diversity among users can also lead to disparities. In the case of the spirometer, a device that measures lung capacity, correction factors are applied based on race, but there is no scientific evidence to suggest that this should occur. Thus, by including racial adjustments, bias is introduced. Medical devices have the potential to affect various populations, but minority and marginalized groups often face disproportionately negative impacts due to biased design.

=== Healthcare Algorithms ===
With the rise of AI, healthcare algorithms have been implemented to aid providers with diagnosis, treatment, evaluation of risk factors, and resource allocation. These algorithms often examine factors such as race and gender, and, in some circumstances, exacerbate race and gender inequalities in health care. An algorithm used to assess kidney function and help providers decide when to refer patients for kidney transplants used race as a factor, and research found that this algorithm overestimated kidney function in black patients and under-referred them for organ transplant. Examples of racial and gender disparities have been found in algorithms used to assess risks of complications for common cardiac surgeries, estimate the viability of potential kidney donors, predict survival rates and life expectancy in rectal cancer patients, access the probability of a successful vaginal birth after C-sections, and many other algorithms.

Many factors contribute to and/or perpetuate the biases in certain healthcare algorithms. Generally, the field of developers of these algorithms tends to be less diverse and less aware of implicit biases. These algorithms tend to be proprietary, hindering the ability of independent parties to access equity issues related to them. Artificial intelligence can also be harder to make sense of and manually control, preventing developers from resolving issues or identifying where algorithms make decisions based on gender or race. Additionally, some algorithms are trained on biased data sets that do not accurately represent the diverse general population. Sometimes the inclusion of race or gender as a factor in these algorithms can exacerbate inequalities in health care as opposed to accounting for them.

=== Vaccination ===
Social and economic conditions also influence how many people take vaccines. Factors such as income, socioeconomic status, ethnicity, age, and education can determine the uptake of vaccines and their impact, especially among vulnerable communities.

Social factors, such as living with others, may affect vaccine uptake. For example, older individuals who live alone are much more likely not to take up vaccines compared to those living with other people. Other factors may be racial, with minority groups being affected by low vaccine uptake.

== Chronic stress and health ==
Stress is hypothesized to be a major influence in the social determinants of health. There is a relationship between experience of chronic stress and negative health outcomes. This relationship is explained through both direct and indirect effects of chronic stress on health outcomes.

The direct relationship between stress and health outcomes is the effect of stress on human physiology. The long-term stress hormone, cortisol, is believed to be the key driver in this relationship. Chronic stress has been found to be significantly associated with chronic low-grade inflammation, slower wound healing, increased susceptibility to infections, and poorer responses to vaccines. Meta-analysis of healing studies has found that there is a robust relationship between elevated stress levels and slower healing for many different acute and chronic conditions However, it is also important to note that certain factors, such as coping styles and social support, can mitigate the relationship between chronic stress and health outcomes.

Stress can also be seen to have an indirect effect on health status. One way this happens is due to the strain on the psychological resources of the stressed individual. Chronic stress is common in those of a low socio-economic status, who are having to balance worries about financial security, how they will feed their families, housing status, and many other concerns. Therefore, individuals with these kinds of worries may lack the emotional resources to adopt positive health behaviors. Chronically stressed individuals may therefore be less likely to prioritize their health.

In addition to this, the way that an individual responds to stress can influence their health status. Often, individuals responding to chronic stress will develop potentially positive or negative coping behaviors. People who cope with stress through positive behaviors, such as exercise or social connections, may be less affected by the relationship between stress and health. In contrast, those with a coping style more prone to over-consumption (i.e., emotional eating, drinking, smoking, or drug use) are more likely to see negative health effects of stress. Vape shops are also found more in low socioeconomic status areas. The owners target these areas in particular to gain profit. Since people with low-income status are not highly educated, they are more prone to make poor health behavior choices. Socioeconomic status also has a huge impact in lives of people of color. According to the Kids Count Data Center, Children in Poverty 2014, in the United States, 39% of African American children and adolescents, and 33% of Latino children and adolescents are living in poverty (Kids Count Data Center, Children in Poverty 2014). The stress these racial groups with low socioeconomic status face is higher than that of the same race group from a high-income community. According to the research done on socioeconomic disparities in vape shop density and proximity to public schools, the researchers found that vape shops were located a lot more in the areas with schools where African-Americans/Latinos/Hispanic students were in higher population than the areas with schools where White population was more. The growing number of vape shops in low-income and ethnically diverse communities causes disparities in healthcare by increasing exposure to tobacco and nicotine products. According to research, targeted advertising and increased accessibility add to growing rates of vaping among younger people and underprivileged populations. Policies that control vape store locations and restrict advertising to vulnerable populations have been offered as possible methods to address these disparities in healthcare access.

To combat chronic stress and it's link to chronic health, in-direct healthcare measures to improve quality especially within the medically compromised community have increasingly been incorporated in Medicare and Medicaid services. The Food is Medicine (FIM) is essential in this campaign, providing services such as "...medically tailored meals, medically tailored grocery provisions, and produce prescriptions, with varying levels of nutrition and culinary education...". Medically inclined nutrition allows marginalized communities to access healthy and nutritional food while preventing the further devastating affects of chronic stress which will worsen chronic illnesses. This healthcare access is carried out through RDNs in the United States, for "...the prevention of metabolic diseases in adults and the prevention and monitoring of malnutrition in the elderly.". Locations such as Project Open Hand in San Francisco were the first in the larger campaign, originating in providing nutrition to HIV/AIDs patients who were affected by wasting syndrome. Organizations involved with the FIM initiative have continued to expand their mission, expanding into the Medicaid programs through the Section 1115 demonstration waiver. As many FIM initiatives are set on a temporary basis, there's increasing pressure for steady federal funding to bridge healthcare access for low-income and marginalized members especially as chronic stress has devastating effects on the outcome of the patient. Nutrition plays a large role in stress and chronic disease, especially for medically compromised individuals that transcends just genetic and environmental factors. The Food is Medicine initiative and approach to both direct and preventative healthcare doesn't just improve healthcare outcomes for individuals suffering from chronic conditions but also nutritional security and long-term health outcomes through various FIM pyramidal models. A Food is Medicine pyramid ranges from levels such as "Population-level healthy food policies and programs" to "Medically tailored meal programs", which gives different populations the support they need, creating a system to reduce and prevent chronic stress and health.

The detrimental effects of stress on health outcomes are hypothesized to partly explain why countries that have high levels of income inequality have poorer health outcomes compared to more equal countries. Wilkinson and Picket hypothesized in their book The Spirit Level that the stressors associated with low social status are amplified in societies where others are clearly far better off.

A landmark study conducted by the World Health Organization and the International Labour Organization found that exposure to long working hours, operating through psychosocial stress, is the occupational risk factor with the largest attributable burden of disease, i.e., an estimated 745,000 fatalities from ischemic heart disease and stroke events in 2016.

== Theoretical approaches ==
The UK Black and The Health Divide reports considered two primary mechanisms for understanding how social determinants influence health: cultural/behavioral and materialist/structuralist The cultural/behavioral explanation is that individuals' behavioral choices (e.g., tobacco and alcohol use, diet, physical activity, etc.) were responsible for their development and deaths from a variety of diseases. However, both the Black and Health Divide reports found that behavioral choices are determined by one's material conditions of life, and these behavioral risk factors account for a relatively small proportion of variation in the incidence and death from various diseases.

The materialist/structuralist explanation emphasizes the people's material living conditions. These conditions include availability of resources to access the amenities of life, working conditions, and quality of available food and housing among others. Within this view, three frameworks have been developed to explain how social determinants influence health. These frameworks are: (a) materialist; (b) neo-materialist; and (c) psychosocial comparison. The materialist view explains how living conditions – and the social determinants of health that constitute these living conditions – shape health. The neo-materialist explanation extends the materialist analysis by asking how these living conditions occur. The psychosocial comparison explanation considers whether people compare themselves to others and how these comparisons affect health and wellbeing.

A nation's wealth is a strong indicator of the health of its population. Within nations, however, individual socio-economic position is a powerful predictor of health. Material conditions of life determine health by influencing the quality of individual development, family life and interaction, and community environments. Material conditions of life lead to differing likelihood of physical (infections, malnutrition, chronic disease, and injuries), developmental (delayed or impaired cognitive, personality, and social development), educational (learning disabilities, poor learning, early school leaving), and social (socialization, preparation for work, and family life) problems. Material conditions of life also lead to differences in psychosocial stress. When the fight-or-flight reaction is chronically elicited in response to constant threats to income, housing, and food availability, the immune system is weakened, insulin resistance is increased, and lipid and clotting disorders appear more frequently. The effects of chronic fight-or-flight is described in the allostatic load model

The materialist approach offers insight into the sources of health inequalities among individuals and nations. Adoption of health-threatening behaviors is also influenced by material deprivation and stress. Environments influence whether individuals take up tobacco, use alcohol, consume poor diets, and have low levels of physical activity. Tobacco use, excessive alcohol consumption, and carbohydrate-dense diets are also used to cope with difficult circumstances. The materialist approach seeks to understand how these social determinants occur.

The neo-materialist approach is concerned with how nations, regions, and cities differ on how economic and other resources are distributed among the population. This distribution of resources can vary widely from country to country. The neo-materialist view focuses on both the social determinants of health and the societal factors that determine the distribution of these social determinants, and especially emphasizes how resources are distributed among members of a society.

The social comparison approach holds that the social determinants of health play their role through citizens' interpretations of their standings in the social hierarchy. There are two mechanisms by which this occurs. At the individual level, the perception and experience of one's status in unequal societies lead to stress and poor health. Feelings of shame, worthlessness, and envy can lead to harmful effects upon neuro-endocrine, autonomic and metabolic, and immune systems. Comparisons to those of a higher social class can also lead to attempts to alleviate such feelings by overspending, taking on additional employment that threaten health, and adopting health-threatening coping behaviors such as overeating and using alcohol and tobacco. At the communal level, widening and strengthening of hierarchy weakens social cohesion, which is a determinant of health. The social comparison approach directs attention to the psychosocial effects of public policies that weaken the social determinants of health. However, these effects may be secondary to how societies distribute material resources and provide security to its citizens, which are described in the materialist and neo-materialist approaches.

=== Life-course perspective ===
Life-course approaches emphasize the accumulated effects of experience across the life span in understanding the maintenance of health and the onset of disease. The economic and social conditions – the social determinants of health – under which individuals live their lives have a cumulative effect upon the probability of developing any number of diseases, including heart disease and stroke. Studies into the childhood and adulthood antecedents of adult-onset diabetes show that adverse economic and social conditions across the life span predispose individuals to this disorder.

Hertzman outlines three health effects that have relevance for a life-course perspective. Latent effects are biological or developmental early life experiences that influence health later in life. Low birth weight, for instance, is a reliable predictor of incidence of cardiovascular disease and adult-onset diabetes in later life. Nutritional deprivation during childhood has lasting health effects as well.

Pathway effects are experiences that set individuals onto trajectories that influence health, well-being, and competence over the life course. As one example, children who enter school with delayed vocabulary are set upon a path that leads to lower educational expectations, poor employment prospects, and greater likelihood of illness and disease across the lifespan. Deprivation associated with poor-quality neighborhoods, schools, and housing sets children off on paths that are not conducive to health and well-being.

Cumulative effects are the accumulation of advantage or disadvantage over time that manifests itself in poor health, in particular between women and men. These involve the combination of latent and pathways effects. Adopting a life-course perspective directs attention to how social determinants of health operate at every level of development – in utero, infancy, early childhood, childhood, adolescence, and adulthood – to both immediately influence health and influence it in the future.

== Improving health conditions worldwide ==
Reducing the health gap requires that governments build systems that allow a healthy standard of living for every resident.

=== Interventions ===
Three common interventions for improving social determinant outcomes, as identified by the WHO, are education, social security, and urban development. However, evaluating interventions has been difficult due to their nature, their impact, and the strong effect they have on children's health outcomes.

1. Education: Many scientific studies have been conducted and strongly suggest that increased quantity and quality of education leads to benefits to both the individual and society (e.g., improved labor productivity). Health and economic outcome improvements can be seen in health measures such as blood pressure, crime, and market participation trends. Examples of interventions include decreasing the size of classes and providing additional resources to low-income school districts. However, there is currently insufficient evidence to support education as a social determinant intervention with a cost-benefit analysis.
2. Social Protection: Interventions such as "health-related cash transfers", maternal education, and nutrition-based social protections have been shown to have a positive impact on health outcomes. However, the full economic costs and impacts generated by social security interventions are difficult to evaluate, especially as many social protections primarily affect the children of recipients. The landmark Cochrane Collaboration Review of the health impact of unconditional cash transfers in low- and middle-income countries found a large body of evidence that these cash transfers clinically meaningfully reduce in the likelihood of being sick (by an estimated 27%), may also improve food security and dietary diversity, and may also reduce extreme poverty and improve school attendance, as well as increase healthcare spending.
3. Urban Development: Urban development interventions include a wide variety of potential targets such as housing, transportation, and infrastructure improvements. The health benefits are considerable (especially for children), because housing improvements such as smoke alarm installation, concrete flooring, removal of lead paint, etc. can have a direct impact on health. In addition, there is a fair amount of evidence to prove that external urban development interventions such as transportation improvements or improved walkability of neighborhoods (which is highly effective in developed countries) can have health benefits. Affordable housing options (including public housing) can make large contributions to both social determinants of health, as well as the local economy, and access to public natural areas -including green and blue spaces- is also associated with improved health benefits.

The Commission on Social Determinants of Health made recommendations in 2005 for action to promote health equity based on three principles: "improve the circumstances in which people are born, grow, live, work, and age; tackle the inequitable distribution of power, money, and resources, the structural drivers of conditions of daily life, globally, nationally, and locally; and measure the problem, evaluate action, and expand the knowledge base." These recommendations would involve providing resources such as quality education, decent housing, access to affordable health care, access to healthy food, and safe places to exercise for everyone despite gaps in affluence. Expansion of knowledge of the social determinants of health, including among healthcare workers, can improve the quality and standard of care for people who are marginalized, poor or living in developing nations by preventing early death and disability while working to improve quality of life.

=== Challenges of measuring value of interventions ===
Many economic studies have been conducted to measure the effectiveness and value of social determinant interventions but are unable to accurately reflect effects on public health due to the multi-faceted nature of the topic. While neither cost-effectiveness nor cost-utility analysis is able to be used on social determinant interventions, cost-benefit analysis is able to better capture the effects of an intervention on multiple sectors of the economy. For example, tobacco interventions have shown to decrease tobacco use, but also prolong lifespans, increasing lifetime healthcare costs and is therefore marked as a failed intervention by cost-effectiveness, but not cost-benefit. Another issue with research in this area is that most of the current scientific papers focus on rich, developed countries, and there is a lack of research in developing countries.

Policy changes that affect children also present the challenge that it takes a significant amount of time to gather this type of data. In addition, policies to reduce child poverty are particularly important, as elevated stress hormones in children interfere with the development of brain circuitry and connections, causing long term chemical damage. In most wealthy countries, the relative child poverty rate is 10 percent or less; in the United States, it is 21.9 percent. The lowest poverty rates are more common in smaller well-developed and high-spending welfare states like Sweden and Finland, with about 5 or 6 percent. Middle-level rates are found in major European countries where unemployment compensation is more generous and social policies provide more generous support to single mothers and working women (through paid family leave, for example), and where social assistance minimums are high. For instance, the Netherlands, Austria, Belgium and Germany have poverty rates that are in the 7 to 8 percent range.

=== Within clinical settings ===
Connecting patients with the necessary social services during their visits to hospitals or medical clinics is an important factor in preventing patients from experiencing decreased health outcomes as a result of social or environmental factors. This can take the form of community health workers who can support patients with their care plans developed in conjunction with their primary care physicians.

A clinical study done by researchers at the University of California San Francisco, indicated that connecting patients with the resources to utilize and contact social services during clinical visits, significantly decreased families social needs and significantly improved children's overall health.

In addition, within the clinical setting, it was noted that in order to better health outcomes for the patients in any clinical setting, a collection of SHD data should be documented. This helps maintain the connection between healthcare systems and organizations that address these needs that were documented.

=== Public policy ===
The Rio Political Declaration on Social Determinants of Health embraces a transparent, participatory model of policy development that, among other things, addresses the social determinants of health leading to persistent health inequalities for indigenous peoples. In 2017, citing the need for accountability for the pledges made by countries in the Rio Political Declaration on Social Determinants of Health, the World Health Organization and United Nations Children's Fund called for the monitoring of intersectoral interventions on the social determinants of health that improve health equity.

The United States Department of Health and Human Services includes social determinants in its model of population health, and one of its missions is to strengthen policies which are backed by the best available evidence and knowledge in the field. Social determinants of health do not exist in a vacuum. Their quality and availability to the population are usually a result of public policy decisions made by governing authorities. For example, early life is shaped by availability of sufficient material resources that assure adequate educational opportunities, food, and housing among others. Much of this has to do with the employment security and the quality of working conditions and wages. The availability of quality, regulated childcare is an especially important policy option in support of early life. These are not issues that usually come under individual control but rather they are socially constructed conditions which require institutional responses. A policy-oriented approach places such findings within a broader policy context. In this context, Health in All Policies has seen as a response to incorporate health and health equity into all public policies as means to foster synergy between sectors and ultimately promote health.

Yet it is not uncommon to see governmental and other authorities individualize these issues. Governments may view early life as being primarily about parental behaviors towards their children. They then focus upon promoting better parenting, assist in having parents read to their children, or urge schools to foster exercise among children rather than raising the amount of financial or housing resources available to families. Indeed, for every social determinant of health, an individualized manifestation of each is available. There is little evidence to suggest the efficacy of such approaches in improving the health status of those most vulnerable to illness in the absence of efforts to modify their adverse living conditions.

A team of the Cochrane Collaboration conducted the first comprehensive systematic review of the health impact of unconditional cash transfers, as an increasingly common up-stream, structural social determinant of health. The review of 21 studies, including 16 randomized controlled trials, found that unconditional cash transfers may not improve health services use. However, they lead to a large, clinically meaningful reduction in the likelihood of being sick by an estimated 27%. Unconditional cash transfers may also improve food security and dietary diversity. Children in recipient families are more likely to attend school, and the cash transfers may increase money spent on health care.

One of the recommendations by the Commission on the Social Determinants of Health is expanding knowledge – particularly to health care workers.

Although not addressed by the WHO Commission on Social Determinants of Health, sexual orientation and gender identity are increasingly recognized as social determinants of health.

With all the different health inequities and differences in quality of care addressed in social determinants of health, the American Hospital Association created the Value Initiative project which helps make healthcare more affordable to people of all types. It does this four different ways:

1. It frames issues regarding the healthcare system and its pricing and affordability.
2. It provides knowledge, resources, and tools for hospitals to supply affordable healthcare and increase value
3. The initiative collects data of hospital experiences to develop new federal policy solutions
4. Builds a platform for the American Hospital Association to discuss with policymakers to find solutions to the lack of affordable care.

This initiative educates the public and makes sure there is transparency in pricing of hospital bills, making sure patients are not billed more than they should be. It also addresses the cost drivers in the healthcare system, and urges for legislators to take action to make healthcare affordable and to prioritize health over profit. This organization asks congress to control the rising costs of pharmaceuticals by encouraging competition between manufacturers, and improving transparency in drug pricing. In this value initiative, they have started the Affordability Advocacy Agenda (AAA) which improves the ongoing policy and advocacy activities. With the COVID-19 pandemic health care spending increased and there was a rise in hospitalizations and therefore a rise in demand for health care providers. The price for care has increased and there aren't enough workers to meet the demand for care. The AAA and congress are working together to provide relief from the pandemic in order to make healthcare more affordable to all.

As of January 1, 2022 there are regulations placed for healthcare providers about no surprise billing. This is the "No Surprises Act" of division BB of the Consolidated Appropriations Act, 2021 and this rule was made by the Biden-Harris administration. Patients should not be billed more than they expected to pay, it is often noticed with emergency services and this rule will stop patients from getting worried about any bills out of their budget, and they will be able to get the proper care they need for their health with peace of mind. The act was passed by congress at the end of 2020 and offers protection against insured Americans getting surprise bills from out-of-network providers. They struggled to find an amount that an insurer should pay to the out-of-network provider, but eventually found an amount and the law is now in effect as of January 2022. When it comes to out-of-network providers, patients often rely on these services in an emergency and then get stuck with the bill afterwards. Air Ambulance bills are a big problem for consumers, not just because they are out of network and cost a lot, but also for their lack of billing transparency. Since the Airline Deregulation Act, which allows air ambulance to make their own prices, federal solutions to this increasing cost of emergency care is needed. A possible solution is to allow air ambulance services to be administered and financed in a way that combines competitive bidding and public utility regulation.

== History ==
Starting in the early 2000s, the World Health Organization facilitated the academic and political work on social determinants in a way that provided a deep understanding of health disparities in a global perspective. In 2003, the World Health Organization (WHO) Europe suggested that the social determinants of health included: the social gradient, stress, early life, social exclusion, work, unemployment, social support, addiction, food, and transportation.

In 2008, the WHO Commission on Social Determinants of Health published a report entitled "Closing the Gap in a Generation", which aimed to understand, from a social justice perspective, how health inequity could be remedied, and what actions could combat factors that exacerbated injustices. The work of the commission was based on development goals, and thus, connected social determinants of health discourse to economic growth and bridging gaps in the healthcare system. This report made three broad recommendations regarding social determinants of health that needed to be addressed. The first imperative was to improve daily living conditions, including work and home physical environments, early childhood development and education, and social protection across the lifespan. The second recommendation was to disrupt the distribution of power, money, and resources, including social inequities such as gender disparities; this recommendation involves a more active role on the part of government. Third, the report calls for a global acknowledgement of the problem so as to take its full measure, as well as assess the impact of any planned interventions.

The 2010 Affordable Care Act (ACA) established by the Obama administration in the United States, embodied the ideas put in place by the WHO by bridging the gap between community-based health and healthcare as a medical treatment, meaning that a larger consideration of social determinants of health was emerging in the policy. The ACA established community change through initiatives like providing Community Transformation Grants to community organizations, which opened up further debates and talks about increased integration of policies to create change on a larger scale.

The 2011 World Conference on Social Determinants of Health, in which 125 delegations participated, created the Rio Political Declaration on Social Determinants of Health. With a series of affirmations and announcements, the Declaration aimed to communicate that the social conditions in which an individual exists were key to understanding health disparities that individual may face, and it called for new policies across the world to fight health disparities, along with global collaborations.

== See also ==
- Adverse Childhood Experiences Study
- Causal inference
- Center for Minority Health
- Commercial determinants of health
- Dennis Raphael
- Diseases of affluence
- Diseases of poverty
- Environmental racism
- Epidemiology
- Etiology
- EuroHealthNet
- Exercise
- Global health
- Health behaviour
- Health equity
- Health literacy
- Health policy
- Healthy People
- Hopkins Center for Health Disparities Solutions
- Inequality in disease
- Medical anthropology
- Medical sociology
- Michael Marmot
- Molecular pathological epidemiology
- Pathogenesis
- Pathology
- Population health
- Population Health Forum
- Race and health
- Richard G. Wilkinson
- Slavery hypertension hypothesis
- Social determinants of health in Mexico
- Social determinants of obesity
- Social determinants of health in poverty
- Social medicine
- Social epidemiology
- Unnatural Causes: Is Inequality Making Us Sick?
- Weathering hypothesis
- Whitehall Study

== Socioeconomic factors and STI risk ==
Socioeconomic status is a key social determinant of health and plays a significant role in the distribution and prevalence of sexually transmitted infections (STIs). Individuals living in lower socioeconomic conditions often face increased exposure to risk factors, including limited access to healthcare services, reduced availability of preventive resources such as condoms, and lower rates of routine screening and early treatment. These barriers can contribute to delayed diagnosis and increased transmission within communities.

In the United States, sexually transmitted infections disproportionately affect populations experiencing socioeconomic disadvantage. According to the Centers for Disease Control and Prevention (CDC), rates of reported chlamydia, gonorrhea, and syphilis are consistently higher in communities with increased poverty levels and reduced access to healthcare services. These disparities are also reflected along racial and ethnic lines, which are closely linked to underlying social and economic inequalities rather than biological differences.

Structural factors, including poverty, housing instability, and limited access to education, further exacerbate STI risk. Communities with fewer healthcare facilities and limited public health infrastructure may experience higher rates of untreated infections. Additionally, stigma and lack of culturally appropriate healthcare services can discourage individuals from seeking testing and treatment.

From a broader public health perspective, these disparities highlight the importance of addressing social and environmental determinants of health. Interventions such as expanding access to affordable healthcare, increasing community-based screening programs, and improving sexual health education are critical for reducing STI burden in underserved populations. These approaches align with a holistic health framework that recognizes the interconnected influences of social, environmental, and systemic factors on health outcomes.

== Barriers to STI prevention and screening ==
Barriers to sexually transmitted infection (STI) prevention and screening are disproportionately experienced by individuals in lower socioeconomic populations. Limited access to affordable healthcare services, lack of health insurance, and transportation challenges can reduce the likelihood of routine STI testing and timely treatment. These barriers contribute to undiagnosed and untreated infections, increasing the risk of ongoing transmission within communities.

Social and cultural factors also play a critical role in shaping access to STI-related services. Stigma associated with STIs, concerns about confidentiality, and distrust of healthcare systems may discourage individuals from seeking testing and care. In some communities, limited access to culturally competent and linguistically appropriate healthcare further exacerbates these challenges.

Addressing these barriers requires targeted public health interventions, including expanding access to free or low-cost screening services, increasing community outreach programs, and integrating STI services into primary care and community health settings. These strategies are essential for reducing disparities and improving sexual health outcomes in underserved populations.
