= EuroHealthNet =

Non-profit health organisation

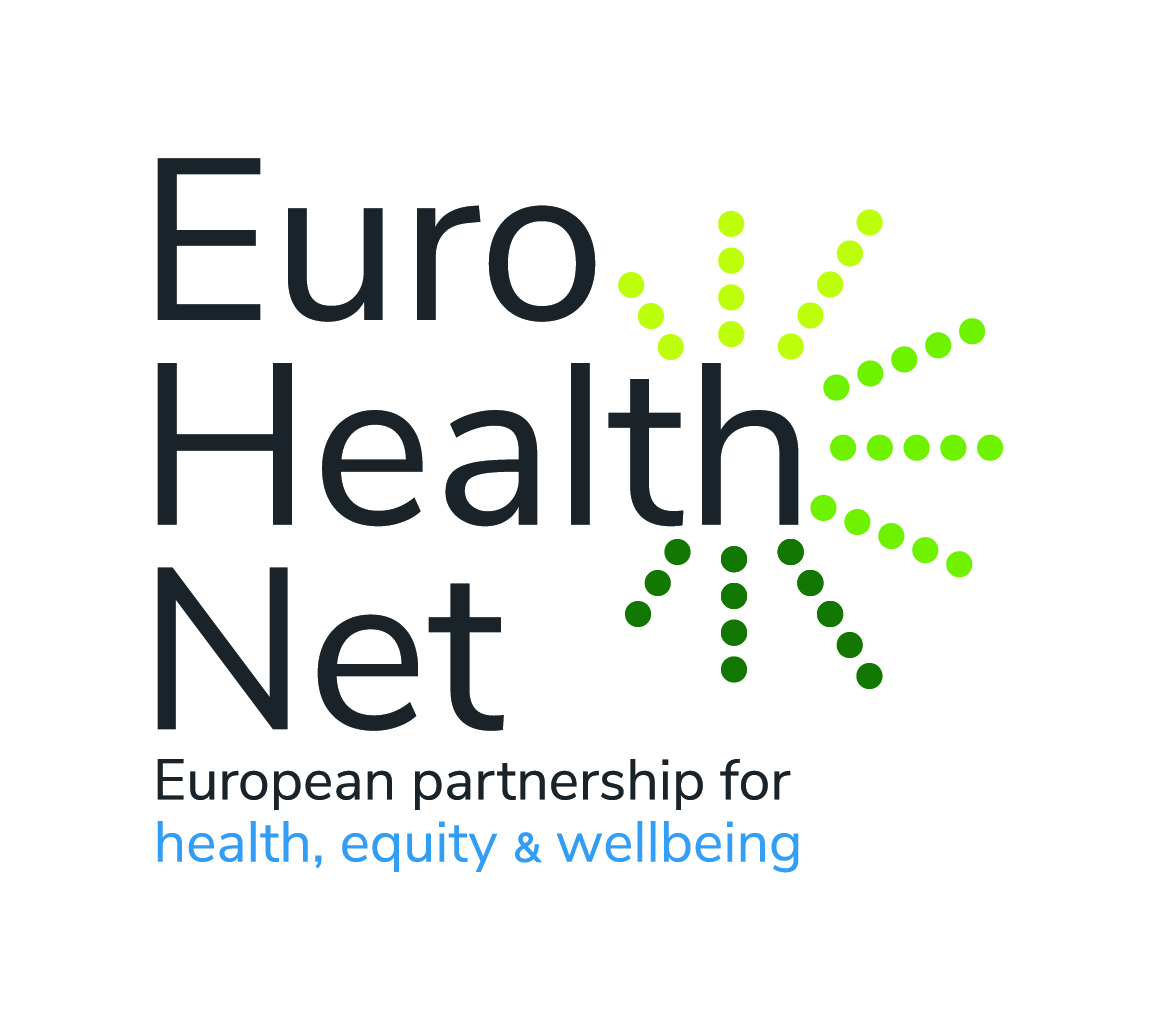
- Company type: Not-for-profit partnership
- Founded: 1996
- Headquarters: City of Brussels, Belgium
- Area served: Europe
- Revenue: 999,000 euro (2021)
- Website: www.eurohealthnet.eu

EuroHealthNet is a non-profit partnership of organisations, agencies and statutory bodies working to contribute to a healthier Europe by promoting health and health equity between and within European countries. EuroHealthNet promotes health through its partnership framework by supporting members’ work in the EU and associated states through policy and project development, networking, and communications.

== Organization ==
The network's office has been located in Brussels since 1996, and staff members are experienced in engaging with the EU institutions, decision makers and a large number of stakeholders from public authorities, civil society, the corporate sector and academia. EuroHealthNet has connections with national and regional governments, as well as with the European institutions, and therefore a good understanding of how evidence and information on health equity can be introduced in current policy making agendas.

The secretariat of around twenty staff is based in Brussels and supports the partnership, which operates in three closely interlinked platforms:

- EuroHealthNet PRACTICE
- EuroHealthNet POLICY
- EuroHealthNet RESEARCH

== Health inequalities and inequities in Europe ==
Health inequalities can be defined as “systematic differences in health between social groups” and populations. Health inequities, on the other hand, are unfair, “avoidable inequalities” of populations within and between countries. The WHO's Committee on the Social Determinants of Health stated that the social gradient – systematic differences between populations – was unfair; “killing people on a grand scale”.

Perhaps the clearest example of health inequalities can be seen in life expectancy. The difference between life expectancy at birth can vary by over a decade between European Union member states. For example, in 2012 the life expectancy at birth for Swedish males is 81 years, whereas in Lithuania a baby born could expect to only live until 68.4. In terms of healthy life years (years of life lived without significant disability), the gap is even greater, with Estonian males born in 2012 predicted to have 18.4 fewer healthy life years than their Maltese counterparts. These disparities in life expectancy don't just exist at the macro scale, but can be seen right down to the neighbourhood level, with differences reaching into the decades. Such disparities are found worldwide, with research looking at demographics and improving life expectancy.

== EU Health Policy ==
Inequalities in health have been an important part of the work of the European Union (EU) since 1992 when specific competencies for public health were included in the Maastricht Treaty. However, as noted above large differences in health still exist between and within all countries in the EU, and some of these inequalities are widening. The EU institutions contribute to reducing health inequalities across the social gradient through a variety of strategies, policies, programmes and initiatives which affect the socio-economic determinants of health.

The Health programmes, the latest being the EU4Health programme, are one of the commission's main instruments for implementing policies aimed at reducing health inequalities. In 2009 the European Commission recognised the challenges and importance of reducing health inequities. In June 2010 the EU adopted its new strategy - Europe 2020: A strategy for smart, sustainable and inclusive growth. The document sets out the proposed economic, social and environmental development for the EU over the next 10 years. Although the strategy does not directly address health inequalities, it clearly acknowledges the need to fight inequalities as a prerequisite for growth and competitiveness.

== EuroHealthNet’s Mission ==
EuroHealthNet seeks to address the factors that shape health and social inequalities, building the evidence base for public health and health-related policies and health promotion interventions in particular to level up the social gradient in health. The enjoyment of the highest attainable standard of health is one of the fundamental rights of every human being without distinction of race, religion, economic or social condition. EuroHealthNet therefore stimulates and supports the implementation of integrated approaches addressing the social determinants of health by operating at all levels and across the political spectrum in relevant health, social and employment fields.

=== Areas of work ===
The topics that EuroHealthNet works on include, but are not limited to:

- Chronic diseases
- Health equity
- Well-being and Economies of Wellbeing
- Mental health
- Childhood development
- Health literacy
- Ageing
- Nutrition and Food systems
- Sustainable lifestyles
- Evidence-based policy making
- HIV/AIDS
- Social protection
- Vaccination and vaccine hesitancy
- Commercial determinants of health
- Digital literacy

== Projects ==
A list of current and past projects is available on the EuroHealthNet website

== See also ==
- Global health
- Social determinants of health
- Effects of climate change on human health
- Health promotion
- Health care
- Health equity
- Sustainable development
