= Social determinants of obesity =

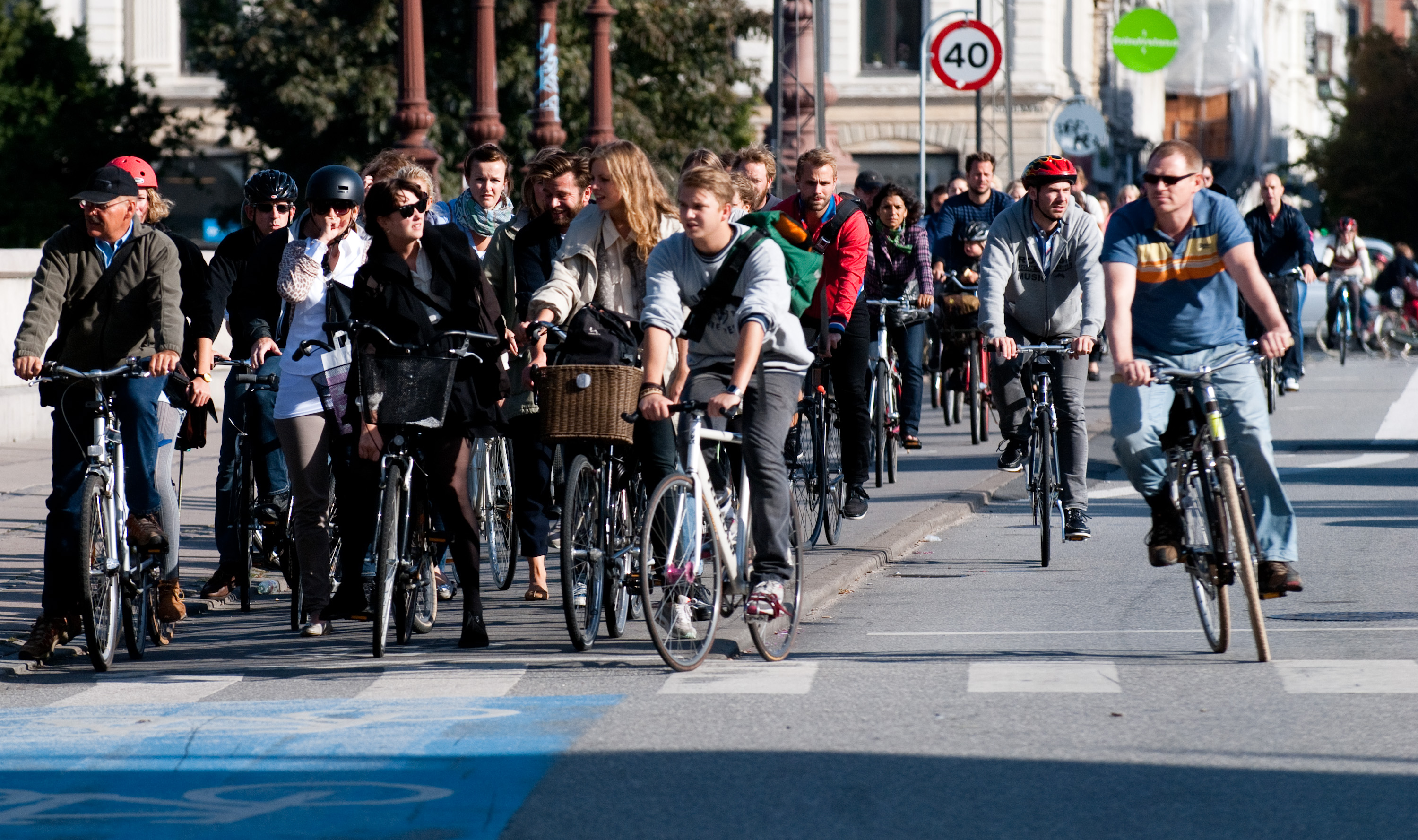
Rush hour in Copenhagen, where 62% of the population commute by bicycle to their work or study places each day

While genetic influences are important to understanding obesity, they cannot explain the current dramatic increase seen within specific countries or globally. It is accepted that calorie consumption in excess of calorie expenditure leads to obesity; however, what has caused shifts in these two factors on a global scale is much debated.

== Social class ==
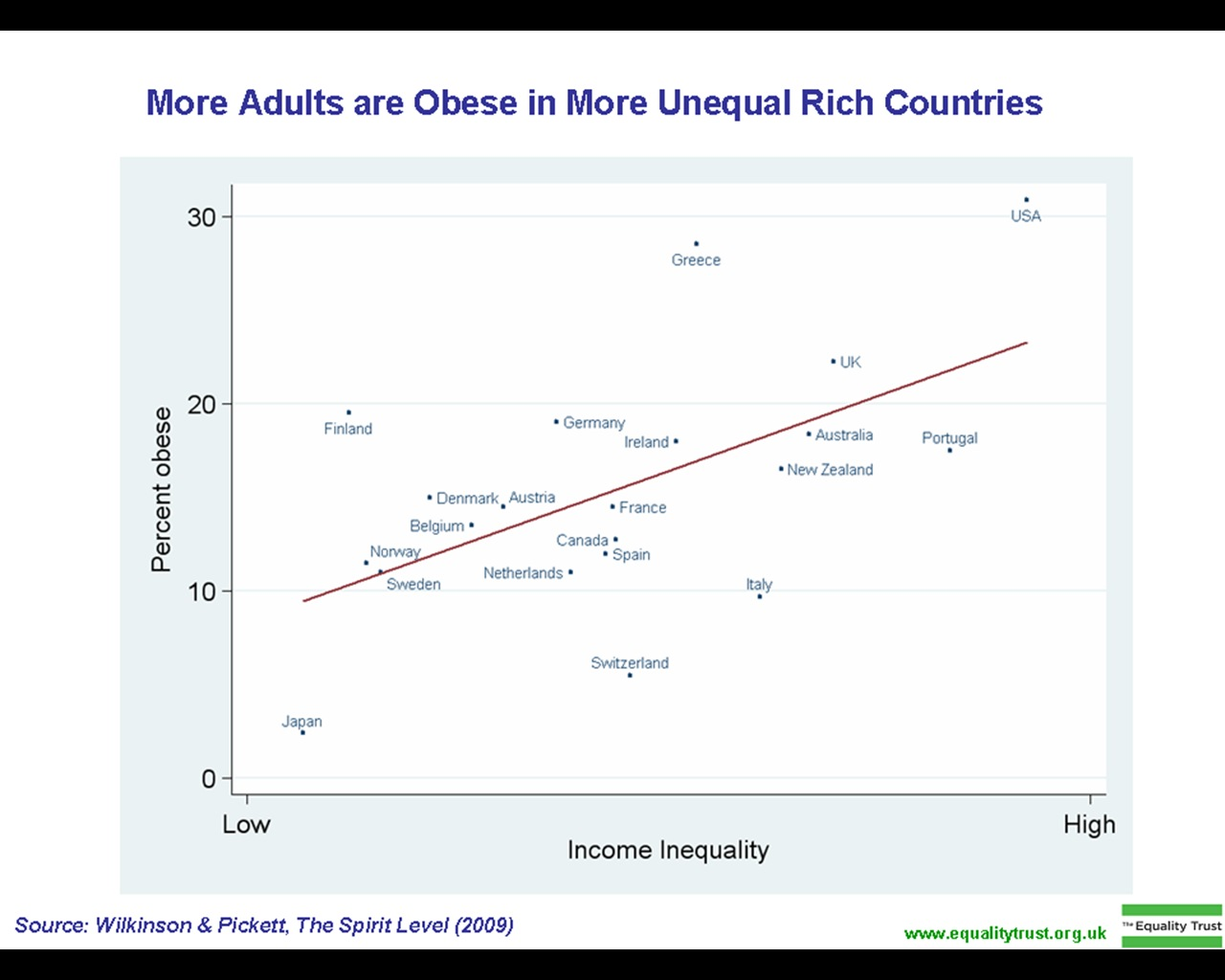
More adults are obese in more unequal rich countries.

The correlation between social class and body mass index (BMI) varies globally. A review in 1989 found that in developed countries women of a high social class were less likely to be obese. No significant differences were seen among men of different social classes. In the developing world, women, men, and children from high social classes had greater rates of obesity. An update of this review carried out in 2007 found the same relationships, but they were weaker. The decrease in strength of correlation was felt to be due to the effects of globalization.

Many explanations have been put forth for associations between BMI and social class. It is thought that in developed countries, the wealthy are able to afford more nutritious food, they are under greater social pressure to remain slim, and have more opportunities along with greater expectations for physical fitness. In undeveloped countries the ability to afford food, high energy expenditure with physical labor, and cultural values favoring a larger body size are believed to contribute to the observed patterns. Attitudes toward body mass held by people in one's life may also play a role in obesity. A correlation in BMI changes over time has been found between friends, siblings, and spouses.

=== Food deserts ===
The term "food desert" was reputedly first used by a resident of a public sector housing scheme in the west of Scotland in the early 1990s to capture the experience of living in a deprived neighborhood where food was expensive and relatively unobtainable. The phrase first appeared in an "official" publication in 1995, as part of a report from a policy working group investigating grocery distribution and food retailing on behalf of the Low Income Project Team of the UK government's Nutrition Task Force. The term "food desert" is used to "describe populated urban areas where residents do not have access to an affordable and healthy diet." Reports have "suggested that food deserts may damage public health by restricting the availability and affordability of foods that form the components of a healthy diet." Nicole I. Larson and her colleagues did a research review to relate obesity with neighborhood environments. They argue that "availability of fast-food restaurants and energy-dense foods has been found to be greater in lower-income and minority neighborhoods." When neighborhoods have more access to supermarkets with fresh produce there is a decrease in unhealthy dietary habits and levels of obesity. "Low-income, minority, and rural neighborhoods" are affected the most by this little access to supermarkets and tend to have greater access to fast-food restaurants and convenience stores with energy-dense food. For example, one study found that high-poverty areas and all African American areas (regardless of income) were less likely than predominantly white higher-income communities to have access to foods that enable individuals to make healthy choices.

However, some recent studies have not been able to confirm the claims that distance to supermarkets predicts obesity or even diet quality.

=== Stress ===
Stress and emotional brain networks foster eating behaviors that may lead to obesity. The neural networks underlying the complex interactions among stressors, body, brain and food intake are now better understood. Stressors, by activating a neural stress-response network, bias cognition toward increased emotional activity and degraded executive function. This causes formed habits to be used rather than a cognitive appraisal of responses. Stress also induces secretion of both glucocorticoids, which increases motivation for food, and insulin. Pleasurable feeding then reduces activity in the stress-response network, reinforcing the feeding habit.

One study found that "higher work stress was associated with higher consumption of specific fatty foods among men but not women."

In another study done by Richardson and her colleagues, "a sample of low-income women with children, we found that perceived stress was directly and positively associated with severe obesity, independent of eating behaviors and diet quality. In addition, perceived stress was directly and positively associated with unhealthy eating behaviors."

=== Education ===
A study done by Shaikh and colleagues found that "in both unadjusted and adjusted analyses, lower levels of education and incomes were generally associated with higher likelihood of obesity and higher mean BMI." Shaikh and his colleagues gathered data from the US National Health Interview Survey about 23,434 adults. With that information, the researchers conducted regression analyses to depict obesity in relation to different socioeconomic parts, such as education. With a P value <.001, they found that obesity was less common in adults with a higher educational attainment versus those with a lower educational attainment. They concluded that education and obesity are highly associated and their call to action was for public schools to have more health education.

Similarly, in a study done in Germany, researchers found that "indicators of parental education were most strongly associated with children's obesity. There was a strong dose–response relationship between a composed index of social class and obesity. Children of the lowest social status had a more than three-fold risk to be obese than children of the highest social status in the screening population."

== Social context of meals ==
=== Family meal-time ===
Social context associated with meal-time plays a key role in factors involved with obesity. Studies have shown the effects of family meal- time in relation to childhood obesity. A study done by Jerica Berge looked only that the interactions at meal times with families and neglected the types of foods they were eating. The results showed that families who ate one or two meals together had lower rates of obesity. In conjunction to eating a meal together, the results showed that table conversations and family dynamics play key roles in lowering the rates of obesity in child and adults. The families who enjoy spending time together, create a sense of cohesion among each other. Family meal-time is a place where everyone can talk about their day and parents provide a positive environment for their children. Positive reinforcements included telling their children if they eat their food they will grow up to be strong and fast. By family members asking about each other day, especially to their child, they see that someone is expressing interest in their life and that they care. The more positive communication there is at the table the lesser amount of food a person will consume. Slowing down your eating is helpful in both losing weight and keeping healthy eating habits because it always your brain too caught up with your eating and signals that you are full sooner. Children will develop these eating habits that reflect a healthy living style demonstrated from their parents and/or other family members.

The group that showed an increase of obesity rates was the family who spent little time together and/or when they did it was a hostile environment. Parents who were more controlling about what and how much their child ate showed an increase their obesity rates. A study done by Heather Patrick showed that this type of feeding style, referred to as authoritarian feeding, has the opposite effect on children's eating habits. In this article, researchers found that limiting or prohibiting a child's access to foods high in fat, sugar, and energy led to the desire to overeat these "forbidden" foods. It creates a sense of anxiety within the child which can lead into them feeling insecure lowering their self-esteem. Children and adults eating in this type of environment also tend to use technology, like being on their phones or watching television, at the table distracting each other from engaging in conversation. Not only was there less communication going on but they also over consume due to mindless eating contributing to the increase of obesity rates in these types of families.

=== Lab studies ===
Many studies have demonstrated the effects of social facilitation. In 1972, researchers Nisbett and Storms invited subjects to eat crackers stating that it was a "taste test". Subjects tasted the crackers alone or were partnered with a confederate who ate either 1 or 20 crackers. Normal-weight subjects ate 29% less with the low-intake model and 25% more with the high-intake model than when alone. In 1979, Polivy et al. invited subjects who had fasted for five hours to eat sandwich quarters. When the subjects were paired with a confederate who ingested eight sandwich quarters, subjects consumed 57% more than when the confederate only ate two quarters.

== Smoking ==
Those who quit smoking gain an average of 4.4 kilograms (9.7 lb) for men and 5.0 kilograms (11.0 lb) for women over ten years. Changing rates of smoking, however, have had little effect on the overall rates of obesity.

A study done by Sucharda found that if there is smoking in families or maternal smoking, the children are put at a higher risk for obesity.

== Label literacy ==
Label literacy in important for people to understand nutritional facts about the foods they eat. In a research study done by Kennen and her colleagues, they sampled 210 obese adult patients at a primary care clinic and determined their literacy levels with a literacy screening instrument. With a p-value of <.05, they found a significant correlation between weight loss knowledge and literacy level. Two out of every three obese patients read below a 9th grade reading level. With these results, they came to the conclusion that the lower literacy a person has, the less knowledgeable they are in regards to the health effects associated with obesity and the more likely they are to underestimate the need to lose weight.

== Early malnutrition ==
Malnutrition in early life is believed to play a role in the rising rates of obesity in the developing world. Endocrine changes that occur during periods of malnutrition may promote the storage of fat once more calories become available.

== Number of children ==
In the United States the number of children a person has had is related to their risk of obesity. A woman's risk of obesity increases by 7% per child, while a man's risk increases by 4% per child. This could be partly explained by the fact that having dependent children decreases physical activity in Western parents.

== Urbanization ==
In the developing world urbanization is playing a role in increasing rate of obesity. In China, overall rates of obesity are below 5%. However, in some cities, rates of obesity are greater than 20%.

== Globalization ==
Globalization has made cheap fatty food available in all the nations, greatly increasing fat intake all over the world. "Fast food chains and vending machines packed with lipid-rich foods as well as high calorie sodas can now be found in Santo Domingo, Dominican Republic and East Oakland, California alike".

There is a debate about the fact that globalization contributes to the obesity pandemics. A 2013 cross sectional review showed that, in high income countries, the global increase in BMI is positively associated with both the index of economic globalization and inequality between countries, after adjustment for covariates. a contrario, a 2017 empirical study demonstrates that globalization, including trade openness, FDI flows, and economic freedom reduce weight gain and obesity among children and youth, supporting the proposition that globalized countries prioritize health because of the importance of labor productivity and human capital due to heightened market competition, ceteris paribus, even if rising incomes might drive high consumption.

== See also ==
- Social class differences in food consumption
- Social determinants of health
- Social multiplier effect
