= Social determinants of health in poverty =

Factors that affect impoverished populations' health and health inequality

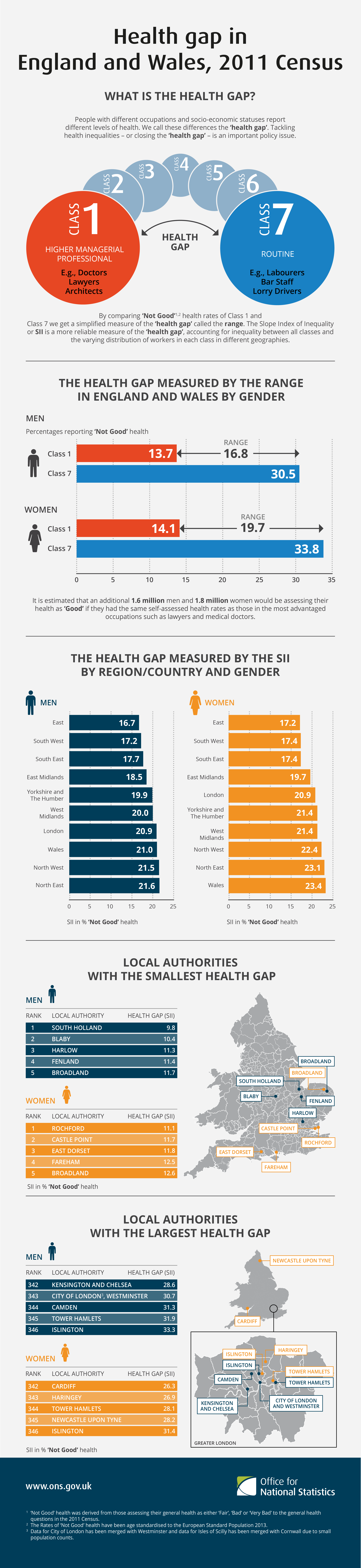
Health gap in England and Wales, 2011 Census

The social determinants of health in poverty describe the factors that affect impoverished populations' health and health inequality. Inequalities in health stem from the conditions of people's lives, including living conditions, work environment, age, and other social factors, and how these affect people's ability to respond to illness. These conditions are also shaped by political, social, and economic structures. The majority of people around the globe do not meet their potential best health because of a "toxic combination of bad policies, economics, and politics". Daily living conditions work together with these structural drivers to result in the social determinants of health.

Poverty and poor health are inseparably linked. Poverty has many dimensions – material deprivation (of food, shelter, sanitation, and safe drinking water), social exclusion, lack of education, unemployment, and low income – that all work together to reduce opportunities, limit choices, undermine hope, and, as a result, threaten health. Poverty has been linked to higher prevalence of many health conditions, including increased risk of chronic disease, injury, deprived infant development, stress, anxiety, depression, and premature death. These health conditions of poverty most burden vulnerable groups such as women, children, ethnic minorities, and disabled people. Social determinants of health – like child development, education, living and working conditions, and healthcare- are of special importance to the impoverished.

Socioeconomic factors that affect impoverished populations such as education, income inequality, and occupation, represent the strongest and most consistent predictors of health and mortality. The inequalities in the apparent circumstances of individual's lives, like individuals' access to health care, schools, their conditions of work and leisure, households, communities, towns, or cities, affect people's ability to lead a flourishing life and maintain health. The inequitable distribution of health-harmful living conditions, experiences, and structures, is not by any means natural, "but is the result of a toxic combination of poor social policies and programmes, unfair economic arrangements, and bad politics". Therefore, the conditions of individual's daily life are responsible for the social determinants of health and a major part of health inequities between and within countries. Along with these social conditions, "Gender, education, occupation, income, ethnicity, and place of residence are all closely linked to people's access to, experiences of, and benefits from health care." Social determinants of disease can be attributed to broad social forces such as racism, gender inequality, poverty, violence, and war. This is important because health quality, health distribution, and social protection of health in a population affect the development status of a nation. Since health has been considered a fundamental human right, one author suggests the social determinants of health determine the distribution of human dignity.

== Definitions and measurements ==
Social determinants of health in poverty reveal inequalities in health. Health is defined "as feeling sound, well, vigorous, and physically able to do things that most people ordinarily can do". Measurements of health take several forms including subjective health reports completed by individuals and surveys that measure physical impairment, vitality and well-being, diagnosis of serious chronic disease, and expected life longevity.

The World Health Organization defines the social determinants of health as "the conditions in which people are born, grow, live, work and age" , conditions that are determined by the distribution of money, power, and resources at global, national, and local levels. There are two main determinants of health: structural and proximal determinants. Structural determinants include societal divisions between social, economic, and political contexts, and lead to differences in power, status, and privilege within society. Proximal determinants are immediate factors present in daily life such as family and household relationships, peer and work relationships, and educational environments. Proximal determinants are influenced by the social stratification caused by structural determinants. Social determinants of health include early child development, globalization, health systems, measurement and evidence, urbanization, employment conditions, social exclusion, public health conditions, and women and gender equality. Different exposures and vulnerabilities to disease and injury determined by social, occupational, and physical environments and conditions, result in more or less vulnerability to poor health.

Social determinants of health have a huge impact on the lives of many individuals. It impacts their job likelihood, success, health, and future. For instance, those who come from lower socioeconomic status are more likely to develop health conditions such as cardiovascular disease. Some factors that affect these individuals and their health are food insecurity, financial stability, and healthcare access. Those who are from lower socioeconomic status backgrounds are likely to have adverse cardiovascular outcomes when compared to higher-income populations who may also be benefiting from curative and preventative strategies.

== Social position ==
=== Poverty gradient and severity ===
Within the impoverished population exists a wide range of real income, from less than US$2 a day, to the United States poverty threshold, which is $22,350 in a year for a family of four. Within impoverished populations, being relatively versus absolutely impoverished can determine health outcomes, in their severity and type of ailment. The poorest of all, globally, are the least healthy. Those in the lowest economic distribution of health, marginalized and excluded, and countries whose historical exploitation and inequality in global institutions of power and policy-making, have the worst health outcomes. As such, two broad categories distinguish between relative severity of poverty. Absolute poverty is the severe deprivation of basic human needs such as food, safe drinking water and shelter, and is used as a minimum standard below which no one should fall regardless of where they live. It is measured in relation to the 'poverty line' or the lowest amount of money needed to sustain human life. Relative poverty is "the inability to afford the goods, services, and activities needed to fully participate in a given society." Relative poverty still results in bad health outcomes because of the diminished agency of the impoverished.

Certain personal, household factors, such as living conditions, are more or less unstable in the lives of the impoverished and represent the determining factors for health amongst the poverty gradient. These factors prove challenging to individuals in poverty and are responsible for health deficits amongst the general impoverished population. Having sufficient access to a minimum amount of food that is nutritious and sanitary plays an important part in building health and reducing disease transmission. Access to sufficient amounts of quality water for drinking, bathing, and food preparation determines health and exposure to disease. Clothing that provides appropriate climatic protection and resources to wash clothes and bedding appropriately to prevent irritation, rashes, and parasitic life are also important to health.Housing, including size, quality, ventilation, crowding, sanitation, and separation, prove paramount in determining health and spread of disease. Availability of fuel for adequate sterilizing of eating utensils and food and the preservation of food proves necessary to promote health. Transportation, which provides access to medical care, shopping, and employment, proves absolutely essential. Hygienic and preventative care, including soap and insecticides, and vitamins and contraceptives, are necessary for maintaining health. Differential access to these life essentials depending on ability to afford with a given income results in differential health.

=== Gender ===
Gender can determine health inequity in general health and particular diseases, and is especially magnified in poverty. Socioeconomic inequality is often cited as the fundamental cause for differential health outcomes among men and women. The health gap between the impoverished and other populations will only be closed if the lives of women are improved and gender inequalities are solved. Therefore, gender empowerment is key in achieving fair distribution of health. The rate at which girls and women die relative to men is higher in low- and middle-income countries than in high-income countries.

"Globally, girls missing at birth and deaths from excess female mortality after birth add up to 6 million women a year, 3.9 million below the age of 60. Of the 6 million, one-fifth is never born, one-tenth dies in early childhood, one- fifth in the reproductive years, and two-fifths at older ages. Excess female deaths have persisted and even increased in countries immensely affected by the HIV/AIDS epidemic, like South Africa. In South Africa, excess female mortality between 10 and 50 years of age rose from close to zero to 74,000 deaths per year in 2008. In impoverished populations, there are pronounced differences in the types of illnesses and injuries men and women contract. According to Ward, poor women have more heart disease, diabetes, cancer, and infant mortality. Poor women also have significant comorbidity, or existence of two ailments, such as psychiatric disorders with psychoactive substance use. They are also at greater risk for contracting endemic conditions like tuberculosis, diabetes, and heart disease. Women of low socioeconomic status in urban areas are more liable to contract sexually transmitted diseases and have unplanned pregnancies. Global studies demonstrate that risk for contracting cervical cancer, exclusive to women, increases as socioeconomic status decreases."

==== Household causes ====
Health of poor women is impacted by gender inequalities through discriminating distribution of household goods, domestic violence, lack of agency, and unfair distribution of work, leisure, and opportunities between each gender. The way in which resources such as income, nourishment, and emotional support are traded in the household influences women's psychosocial health, nutrition, wellness, access to healthcare services, and threat of violence. The exchange of these elements in a home mediates in the impacts of geographical, cultural, and household patterns that result in inequality in health status and outcomes. Health-related behaviors, access and use of healthcare, stress, and psychosocial resources like social ties, coping, and spirituality all serve as factors that mediate health inequality. Household discrimination causes missing girls at birth, and the persistence of discrimination and poor service delivery perpetuates high female mortality.

==== Societal causes ====
Socioeconomic status has long been related to health, those higher in the social hierarchy typically enjoy better health than do those below. With respect to socioeconomic factors, poor institutions of public health and services can cause worse health in women. Components of the geopolitical system that spawn gender and economic inequality, such as history of a nation, geography, policy, services, legal rights, organizations, institutions, and social structures, are all determinants of women's health in poverty. These structures, like socio-demographic status and culture, norms and sanctions, shape women's productive role in the workplace and reproductive role in the household, which determines health. Women's social capital, gender roles, psychological stress, social resources, healthcare, and behavior form the social, economic, and cultural effects on health outcomes. Also, women facing financial difficulty are more likely to report chronic conditions of health, which occurs often in the lives of the impoverished. Socioeconomic inequality is often cited as the fundamental cause for differential health outcomes among men and women.

In India, differences in socioeconomic status and resulting financial disempowerment for women explain the poorer health and lower healthcare utilization noted among older women compared to men. Psycho-social factors also contribute to differences in reported health. First, women might report higher levels of health problems as a result of differential exposure or reduced access to material and social factors that foster health and well-being Second, women might report higher health problems because of differential vulnerability to material, behavioral, and psychosocial factors that foster health.

==== Prenatal and maternal health ====
Prenatal care also plays a role in the health of women and their children, with excess infant mortality in impoverished populations and nations representing these differentials in health. According to Ward, poverty is the strongest predictor of insufficient prenatal care, which is caused by three factors that reduce access. These include socio-demographic factors (such as age, ethnicity, marital status, and education), systematic barriers, and barriers based on lack of knowledge, attitudes and life-styles. Several studies show the complex associations between poverty and education, employment, teen births, and the health of the mother and child. In 1985, The World Health Organization estimated that maternal mortality rates were 150 times higher in developing countries than developed nations. Furthermore, increased rates of postpartum depression were found in mothers belonging to low socioeconomic status.

==== Differential health for men ====
There also exist differentials in health with respect to men. In many post-transition countries, like the Russian Federation, excess female mortality is not a problem, but rather there has been an increase in mortality risks for men. Evidence suggests that excess male mortality correlates with behavior considered socially acceptable among men, including smoking, binge drinking, and risky activities. According to Moss, "Women are more likely to experience role strain and overload that occur when familial responsibilities are combined with occupation-related stress."

=== Age ===
Social determinants can have differential effects on health outcomes based on age group.

==== Youth health ====
Adolescent health has been proven to be influenced by both structural and proximal determinants, but structural determinants play the more significant role. Structural determinants such as national wealth, income inequality, and access to education have been found to affect adolescent health. Additionally, proximal determinants such as school and household environments are influenced by stratification created by structural determinants, can also affect adolescent health. Access to education was determined to be the most influential structural determinant affecting adolescent health.Proximal determinants include household and community factors, such as household environment, familial relationships, peer relationships, access to adequate food, and opportunities for recreation and activity. The most influential proximal determinant has proven to be family affluence. Family affluence directly affects food security, which correlates with adolescent nutrition and health. Family affluence also influences participation in regular physical activity. While nutrition and physical activity promote physical well-being, both promote psychological health as well. Thus family affluence is correlated with reduced psychological stress during adolescence. Family affluence also affects access to healthcare services; however, in countries with universal healthcare systems, youth belonging to less-affluent households still display poorer health than adolescents from wealthier families. One study (that followed individuals from childhood to adulthood) showed that housing environment impacted mortality, with the main cause of death being the presence of pollutants in the house. Higher rates of chronic diseases such as obesity and diabetes, as well as cigarette smoking were found in adolescents aged 10–21 belonging to low socioeconomic status.

==== Infant health ====
Poverty during pregnancy has been reported to cause a wide range of disparities in newborns. Low maternal socioeconomic status has been correlated with low infant birth weight and preterm delivery, physical complications such as ectopic pregnancy, poorer infant physical condition, compromised immune system and increased susceptibility to illness, and prenatal infant death. Sixty percent of children born into poor families have at least one chronic disease. Infant mental complications include delayed cognitive development, poor academic performance, and behavioral problems. Poor women display greater rates of smoking, alcohol consumption, and engagement in risky behaviors. Such risk factors function as stressors that, in combination with social factors such as crowded and unhygienic living environments, financial difficulties, and unemployment, affect fetus health.

=== Ethnicity ===
Ethnicity can play an especially large part in determining health outcomes for impoverished minorities. Poverty can overpower race, but within poverty, race highly contributes to health outcomes. African Americans, even in some of the wealthiest cities in the United States, have lower life expectancy at birth than people in much poorer countries like China or India. In the United States, specifically for African American women, as of 2013 for every 100,000 births 43.5 black women would not survive compared to the 12.7 of white women According to studies, black individuals in South Africa have worse morbidity and mortality rates due to the limited access to social resources. Poverty is the chief cause of the endemic amounts of disease and hunger and malnutrition among this population. A disproportionate number of cases of the AIDS epidemic in North America are from American minorities, with 72% of women's AIDS cases among Hispanic or African-American women. Among those American minorities, African Americans comprise 12% of the American population yet, made up 45% of new HIV diagnoses. Blacks in American account for the highest proportion of those living with HIV and AIDS in America.

Farmer says the growing mortality differentials between whites and blacks must be attributed to class differentials- which includes recognizing race within impoverished populations. Recognition of race as a determining factor for poor health without recognizing poverty has misled individuals to believe race is the only factor. A 2001 study showed that even with health care insurance, many African Americans and Hispanics lacked a health care provider; the numbers doubled for those without insurance (uninsured: White 12.9%, Black 21.0%, Hispanics 34.3%). With both race and insurance status as obstacles, their health care access and their health declined.

Health differentials amongst races can also serve as determining factors for other facets of life, including income and marital status. AIDS-affected Hispanic women hold smaller salaries than average women, are part of poorer families, and are more likely to head households. According to one study, black teenage women living in dysfunctional homes were more likely to have serious health issues for themselves or children.

Redlining intentionally excluded black Americans from accumulating intergenerational wealth. The effects of this exclusion on black Americans' health continue to play out daily, generations later, in the same communities. This is evident currently in the disproportionate effects that COVID-19 has had on the same communities which the HOLC redlined in the 1930s. Research published in September 2020 overlaid maps of the highly affected COVID-19 areas with the HOLC maps, showing that those areas marked "risky" to lenders because they contained minority residents were the same neighborhoods most affected by COVID-19. The Centers for Disease Control (CDC) looks at inequities in the social determinants of health like concentrated poverty and healthcare access that are interrelated and influence health outcomes with regard to COVID-19 as well as quality of life in general for minority groups. The CDC points to discrimination within health care, education, criminal justice, housing, and finance, direct results of systematically subversive tactics like redlining which led to chronic and toxic stress that shaped social and economic factors for minority groups, increasing their risk for COVID-19. Healthcare access is similarly limited by factors like a lack of public transportation, child care, and communication and language barriers which result from the spatial and economic isolation of minority communities from redlining. Educational, income, and wealth gaps that result from this isolation mean that minority groups' limited access to the job market may force them to remain in fields that have a higher risk of exposure to the virus, without options to take time off. Finally, a direct result of redlining is the overcrowding of minority groups into neighborhoods that do not boast adequate housing to sustain burgeoning populations, leading to crowded conditions that make prevention strategies for COVID-19 nearly impossible to implement.

Relatedly, maintenance of good health through the utilization of proper healthcare resources can be quite costly and therefore unaffordable to certain populations. According to the Healthy People 2030, people with steady employment are less likely to live in poverty and more likely to be healthy, however, many people struggle with finding and keeping a job. Social needs, environmental factors and barriers to accessing health care that are unaddressed could lead to worse health outcomes for people with lower incomes. Additionally, residents of impoverished communities are at increased risk for mental illness, chronic disease, higher mortality, and lower life expectancy.

Housing is another critical aspect of economics as a social determinant of health. In a 2020 housing study in which millions of court records on renter evictions were analyzed, the evidence on racial and gender demographics were dramatic. Black and Latino tenants experienced significantly higher eviction rates than their white counterparts. And housing instability plays a critical role in health outcomes: when families have to spend a disproportionately high percentage of income (30% or more) on housing, there are insufficient funds remaining for essentials such as healthy foods, consistent health care, and medications. Racial disparities in eviction rates correspond to negative health outcomes, including depression.

Food security—meaning consistent availability and affordability of food that promotes well-being and prevents disease—is another important social determinant of health linked to economics. Food insecurity increases in neighborhoods where access to healthy food is limited because of travel distance to supermarkets and lack of transportation. Families living in poverty struggle with consistent access to sufficient healthy food, and suffer negative health outcomes as a result; food insecurity has been demonstrated to correlate with many health issues, including chronic disease and obesity.

As one's job or career is a primary conduit for both financial and social capital, work is an important, yet under represented, factor in health inequities research and prevention efforts. There are many ways that a job can affect one's health, such as the job's physical demands, exposure to hazards, mechanisms of employment, compensation and benefits, and availability of health and safety programs. In addition, those who are in steady jobs are less likely to face poverty and its implications and more likely to have access to health care.

=== Education ===
Education plays an especially influential part in the lives of the impoverished. Education determines other factors of livelihood like occupation and income that determines income, which determines health outcomes. Education is a major social determinant of health, with educational attainment related to improved health outcomes, due to its effect on income, employment, and living conditions. Social resources, such as education, determine life expectancy and infant mortality, which measures health. Education has a lasting, continuous, and increasing effect on health. Education is a special determinant of health because it enables people toward self-direction, which leads them to seek goals such as health. Education helps the impoverished develop usable skills, abilities, and resources that help individuals reach goals, including bettering health. Parent's educational level is also important to health, which influences the health of children and the future population. Parent's education level also determines child health, survival, and their educational attainment (Caldwell, 1986; Cleland & Van Ginneken, 1988). "Children born to more educated mothers are less likely to die in infancy and more likely to have higher birth weights and be immunized. Studies in the United States suggest maternal education results in higher parity, greater use of prenatal care, and lower smoking rates, which positively affects child health. An increase in child schooling in Taiwan during the educational reform of 1968 reduced the infant morality rate by 11%, saving 1 infant per 1000 births.

=== Occupation ===
Impoverished workers are more likely to hold part-time jobs, move in and out of work, be migrant workers, or experience stress associated with being unemployed and searching unsuccessfully for unemployment, which all in turn affects health outcomes. According to the World Health Organization, employment and working conditions greatly affect health equity (Kivimaki et al., 2003). This occurs because poor employment conditions exposes individuals to health hazards, which are more likely for low-status jobs. Evidence confirms that high job demand, low control, and low rewards for effort in these low status jobs are risk factors for mental and physical health problems, such as a 50% excess risk of heart disease (Stansfeld & Candy, 2006). The growing power of massive, conglomerate global corporations and institutions to set labor policy and standards agendas has disempowered workers, unions, and the job-seeking by subjecting these individuals to health-damaging working conditions. (EMCONET, 2007). In high- income countries, there has been a growth in job insecurity and precarious employment arrangements (such as informal work, temporary work, part-time work, and piecework), job losses, and a weakening of regulatory protections. Informal work can threaten health through its precarious job instability, lack of regulation to protect working conditions and occupational health and safety. Evidence from the WHO suggests mortality is greater among temporary workers than permanent workers. (Kivimaki et al., 2003). Since most of the global workforce operates under the informal economy, particularly low- and middle-income countries, impoverished populations are greatly affected by these factors.

=== Migration status ===
Migrants have a variety of physical and mental health needs, shaped by their background, the host country's entry and integration policies, and their living and working conditions. Refugees and migrants remain among the most vulnerable members of society and may be faced with inadequate or restricted access to health services. Xenophobia, discrimination, and working conditions may further affect their mental health disproportionally. Comparison of a poor but mainly non-migrant population in rural Uganda with disadvantaged migrant population in urban South-Africa and urban Sweden found lower self-reported frequency of physical activity and lower social support and self-efficacy in the urban migrant samples.

== Socioeconomic and political context ==
=== Location ===
==== Nation-state/geographical region ====
Which particular nation an impoverished person lives in deeply affects health outcomes. This can be attributed to governmental, environmental, geographical, and cultural factors. Using life expectancy as a measure of health indicates a difference between countries in likeliness of living to a certain age. Where people are born dramatically impacts their life chances. High-income countries like Japan or Sweden have a life expectancy of 80 years, Brazil-72, India-63. The WHO cites that for rich countries, only 56 (Iceland) to 107 (US) of 1000 adults between 15 and 60 years old will die each year, while Western and Central African countries have adult mortality rates exceeding 300 and 400 of every 1000. The rates are even higher in African nations in the AIDS epidemic, such as Zimbabwe where 772 of 1000 adults die each year (WHO 2010). Also, the type of health condition varies by countries for populations in poverty. Over 80% of cardiovascular disease deaths, that totaled 17.5 million people globally in 2005, occur in low- and middle-income countries. According to the WHO,13500 people die from smoking every day, and soon it will become the leading cause of death in developing countries, just as in high income countries. (Mathers & Loncar, 2005).

Infant and maternal mortality also reveals disparity in health between nations. There exist great inequalities in infant death rates within and between countries, ranging from 20/10000 births in Columbia to 120/10000 in Mozambique. In 1985, The World Health Organization estimated that maternal mortality rates were 150 times higher in developing countries than developed nations.

==== Urban or rural location ====
===== Urban =====
The location where people live affects their health and life outcomes, which means impoverished people's health outcomes are especially determined by whether they live in a metropolitan area or rural area. In the 19th and 20th century, slums developed in cities and the ensuing crowding, poor sanitation, and inadequate dwellings brought infectious disease and illnesses, causing public health concerns. With the prevalence of inner city ghettos and slums around the globe in cities, with approximately 1 billion people living in slums globally, living situation is an especially strong determinant of health in poverty. Urban areas present health risks through poor living conditions, limited food resources, traffic accidents, and pollution. Urbanization is immensely altering public health problems, particularly for the poor, by directing it towards non-communicable diseases, accidental and violent injuries, and death and health impacts from ecological disaster. (Capbell & Campbell, 2007; Yusuf et al., 2001). Daily living conditions enormously impact health equity too. Equity in living conditions, such as access to quality housing and clean water and hygiene, have been greatly degraded in urban areas by increasing car dependence, land use for roads, inconvenience of non-car transportation, air quality, greenhouse gas emissions, and lack of physical activity (NHF, 2007). The challenges of urban areas, such as high population density, crowding, unsuitable living conditions, and little social support, provide a special challenge to disabled people and populations in low and middle income countries (Frumkin et al., 2004).

- Obesity: Obesity is a paramount problem, especially among the poor and socially disadvantaged, in cities worldwide, according to the WHO (Hawkes et al., 2007; Friel, Chopra & Satcher, 2007). The increased amount of obesity can be contributed to the nutrition transition that describes how people are now increasingly turning to high-fat, sugar, and salt food sources because of their availability and price. This food transition has fueled the obesity epidemic. This nutrition transition tends to start in cities because of "greater availability, accessibility, and acceptability of bulk purchases, convenience foods, and 'supersized' portions" (Dixon et al., 2007). Physical activity and exercise is strongly determined by the design of cities, including density of homes, heterogeneous land uses, the extent to which streets and sidewalks connect, the walkability, and the provision of and access to local public accommodations and parks for recreation and play. These factors, along with increasing reliance on cars, results in the shift of the population toward physical inactivity, which damages health (Friel, Chopra & Satcher, 2007).
- Crime: Violence and crime are major urban health challenges. Worldwide, 90% of the 1.6 million annual violent deaths occur in low and middle income counties (WHO, 2002). A large number of deaths and injuries occur because of crime, which affects health.
- Traffic: Individuals in ghettos and urban areas are the most affected by traffic injuries and vehicle-created air pollution, which causes 800,000 annual deaths due to air pollution, and 1.2 million from traffic accidents. (Roberts & Meddings, 2007; Prüss- Üstün & Corvalán, 2006). This results in greater health risks, like death, for impoverished populations in cities.
- Mental illness: Living in a ghetto increases the likelihood of developing a mental illness, especially in children. People in this environment are less likely to receive effective mental health services. Children exposed to ongoing poverty, present in a ghetto, present a high level of depression, anxiety, social withdrawal, peer conflict and aggression. Mental health symptoms are increased in the ghetto due to exposure to community crime, gang induced violence, neighborhood drug infestations, and substandard housing conditions.
- Other: In the United States, HIV is more prevalent in cities along the east coast, with prevalence among African-American women in cities 5 to 15 times higher than for women in all areas of that state. "Inner-city women are the most likely of all in the United States to birth dead or extremely sick babies, partially because the massive erosion of prenatal care availability in their area. Slums, made up exclusively of extremely poor populations, provide a particularly strong threat for poor health. Child mortality in the slums of Nairobi, which 60% of the population inhabits, is 2.5 times greater than in other areas of the city. In the slums of Manila, 39% of children have TB, which is twice the national average. The term 'housing instability' describes a condition in which people have been or will be homeless in the future. People facing such instability have poorer health care access and more acute health problems than the rest of the population. A city populations grew and rents rose, those receiving Section 9 housing vouchers could no longer afford the rising rents and were forced to move away.

===== Rural =====
Living in a rural community, whether in the United States, or around the globe, reduces access to medical services, health insurance, and changes health culture. Differentials exist between rural and urban communities, and some health disadvantages exist for impoverished rural residents. Since health of a population increases in geographical locations that have a higher prevalence of primary care physicians, rural areas face worse health. According to certain studies, measures of health and well-being indicate that rural populations have worse health outcomes. Rural residents have a greater rate of premature mortality (less than age 75 at death) than urban residents. According to certain studies in the United States, the death rate of individuals age 1–24 years was 31% higher than those in urban counties. The death rate of adults 25 to 64 years old was 32% higher among rural residents than those of suburban counties and of urban counties. These higher death rates were contributed to unintentional injuries, suicide, and chronic obstructive pulmonary disease. In 1997 in the United States, 18% of adults in rural areas had chronic health conditions, compared to only 13% of suburban adults. The National Health Interview Survey indicated that in 1998, 16% of rural adults reported poor health. Poor rural residents have only 21% Medicaid coverage, while poor urban populations report 30% coverage. Demographic and socioeconomic factors vary between rural and urban areas, which contributes to some health disparities. For extremely poor rural communities, variables in the community, like ecological setting, including climate, soil, rainfall, temperature, altitude, and seasonality greatly impact health. "In rural subsistence societies, these variables can have strong influence on child survival by affecting the quantity and variety of food crops produced, the availability and quality of water, vector-borne disease transmission".

=== Governance/policy ===
Type and structure of governments and their social and economic policy more deeply affects the health of the impoverished than other populations. Every component of government- from finance, education, housing, employment, transportation, and health policy- affects population health and health equity. Life expectancy variation between countries can be partially attributed to the type of political regime, whether that be fascist, communist, conservative, or social-democratic. It is suggested by WHO that those who are the most vulnerable and affected by policy changes that influence their quality of health should have a direct hand in the construction and adoption of these same policies. This power in contribution would have a positive impact on their health outcomes, due to their ability to participate autonomously in policies that influence their health. However, changing the status of government regime does not always end the type of policies in place, as seen in South Africa. The end of South Africa's apartheid regime has still not dismantled the structures of inequality and oppression, which has led the persistent social inequality to perpetuate the spread of HIV, diminishing population health. Also, the political economy, encompassing production organization, physical infrastructure, and political institutions [9] play a large role in determining health inequalities.

=== Social service and healthcare availability ===
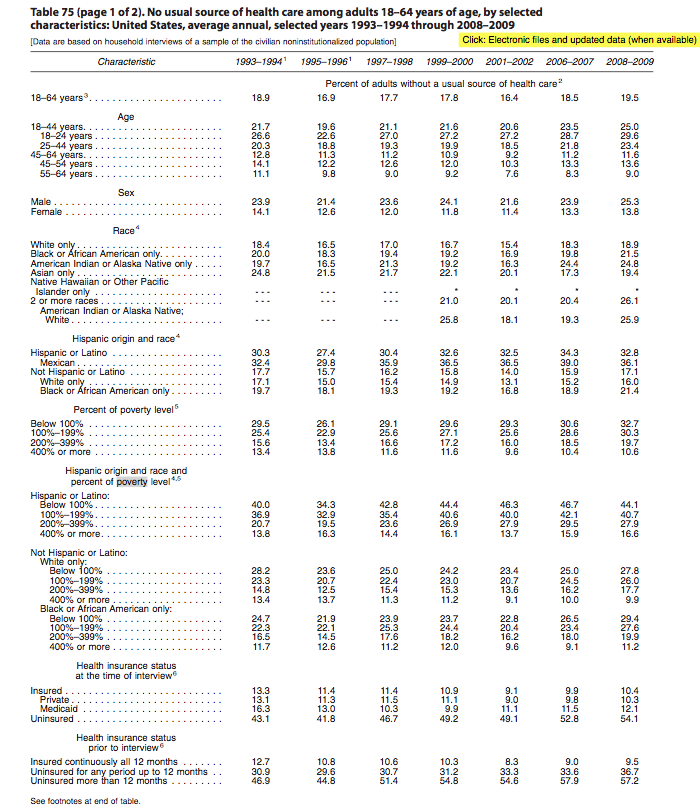
No usual source of healthcare due to weak social safety net

The social environment that impoverished people dwell in is often a precursor to the quality of their health outcomes. Without equitable access to basic social needs, it is difficult to have a quality standard of health while under a significant financial burden. The Commission of Social Determinants of Health, created in 2015 by the World Health Organization, was a pioneer in the push for more focus on "creating better social conditions for health, particularly among the most vulnerable people". These basic social needs that influence social environment include food security, housing, education, transportation, healthcare access and more factors that can affect health. Social services and social service programs, which provide support in access to basic social needs, are made critical in the improvement in health conditions of the impoverished. Impoverished people depend on healthcare and other social services to be provided in the social safety net, therefore availability greatly determines health outcomes. Since low living standards greatly influence health inequity, generous social protection systems result in greater population health, with lower mortality rates, especially in disadvantaged populations. A successful example of such social service program is the Senior Companion program, an extension of the United States federal program Senior Corps. The program provides assistance for adults who have physical and mental disadvantages. It pairs up senior volunteers with patients who come from low-income background to help them increase their social capability, ability to live independently and more accessibility to healthcare. A mixed-method study explores that the program does target various social determinants of health and have positive effects on enrolled elders' health status (although less positive correlation long-term). It concludes that the program does have enthusiastic impacts on clients and volunteers' overall wellness. The result is homogeneous with conclusions from other studies, with emerging themes include: companionship, reduced depression, access to healthcare, isolation, and increased social network. Another example of a utilized social service program in Northern California is the UCSF Benioff Children's Hospital Oakland Find Program. This program employs a method of addressing the social determinants of health, liaison work, contextualized by their predominantly impoverished patient population. This liaison work involves caseworkers in the clinic connecting patients to basic social needs resources. Similar positive results have been found, suggesting that this liaison work is effective in bettering the health status of those in marginalized positions of society.

Nations that have more generous social protection systems have better population health (Lundberg et al., 2007). More generous family policies correlate with lower infant mortality. Nations that offered higher coverage and reimbursement for pensions and sickness, unemployment, and employment accident insurance have a higher LEB (Lundberg et al., 2007), as well as countries with more liberal pensions have less senior mortality. (Lundberg et al., 2007)

==== Access to Healthcare ====
The health care system represents a social determinant of health as well as it influences other determining factors. People's access to health care, their experiences there, and the benefits they gain are closely related to other social determinants of health like income, gender, education, ethnicity, occupation, and more. For poor people, systematic barriers in the social structure are formidable, especially financing. Medicaid and maternity coverage structures have complex and time-consuming registration processes, along with long waits and unsure eligibility. A study of the Emergency Department found that the majority of patients presenting with mental illness were those on Medical (20.4%) and Medicare (31.5%), whereas only 12.4% of privately insured patients presented with mental illness. California has expanded its eligibility of Medi-Cal under federal law to cover as many people as possible. Inequalities in health are also determined by these socioeconomic and cultural factors. Health care is inequitably distributed globally, with pronounced inequality for the poor in low- and middle-income countries. One study demonstrated that doctors treat poor populations differently, showing that disadvantaged patients are less likely to receive the recommended diabetic treatments and are more likely to undergo hospitalization due to the complications of diabetes (Agency for Health Care Research and Quality, 2003). According to the WHO, healthcare systems can most improve health equality when institutions are organized to provide universal coverage, where everyone receives the same quality healthcare regardless of ability to pay, as well as a Primary Healthcare system rather than emergency center assistance.

These structural problems result in worse healthcare and therefore worse health outcomes for impoverished populations. Health care costs can pose absolutely serious threats to impoverished populations, especially in countries without proper social provisions. According to US HHS, "In 2009, children 6–17 years of age were more likely to be uninsured than younger children, and children with a family income below 200% of the poverty level were more likely to be uninsured than children in higher-income families." In elderly populations, individuals below 400% of the poverty line were between 3 and 5 times more likely to lack insurance. Children below 200% of the poverty line were also less likely to have insurance than wealthier families. Also, in 2009 in the US, 20% of adults (ages 18–64) below 200% of the poverty line did not receive their necessary drugs because of cost, compared to only 4% of those above 400% of the poverty line. Increasing healthcare costs (including higher premiums) imposed a burden on consumers. In 2010, President Obama introduced the Patient Protection and Affordable Care Act (ACA), expanding health care to many that lacked coverage. The U.S. had the highest rate of uninsured people, and the highest health care costs, of all industrialized nations at the time. The ACA helped 20 million Americans get coverage and decreased the rates of uninsured from 16% in 2010 to 8.6% in 2016. The ACA brought coverage to people who had had downgrades in Employee Insurance programs, by providing a health insurance marketplace, giving them access to private insurance plans along with income-based government subsidies. This can be seen in other nations, where in Asia, payments for healthcare pushed almost 3% of the population of 11 countries below 1 US$ per day. However, under the current U.S. administration, there have been shifts in how federal funding is allocated to social service programs. Although, initiatives like the National Prevention Council have been established to address prevention, there have also been some drawbacks. Because of this political shift, entities that address the social determinants of health in poverty, like social service programs, are threatened under these new policies. These policies reallocate funding away from public social service programs, causing resources that promote prevention and public health to be limited. The problem most present with state provisioned resources like public social service programs that aim to alleviate health disparities are the ever changing political spheres that either propel or block communities from access to effective health care resources and interventions. Despite the strength of political influences, it has been shown that, globally, shifting attention to addressing social needs like healthcare access has dramatically affected the health of impoverished communities.

=== Societal psychological influences ===
In impoverished communities, different social norms and stressors exist than in other populations, which can greatly affect health outcomes in disadvantaged populations. According to the National Institutes of Health, "low socioeconomic status may result in poor physical and/or mental health ... through various psychosocial mechanisms such as poor or "risky" health-related behaviors, social exclusion, prolonged and/ or heightened stress, loss of sense of control, and low self-esteem as well as through differential access to proper nutrition and to health and social services (National Institutes of Health 1998)." These stressors can cause physiological alterations including increased cortisol, changed blood-pressure, and reduced immunity which increases their risks for poor health.

=== Structural violence ===
Underlying social structures that propagate and perpetuate poverty and suffering- structural violence- majorly determine health outcomes of impoverished populations. Poor and unequal living conditions result from deeper structural conditions, including "poor social policies and programs, unfair economic arrangements, and bad politics," that determine the way societies are organized. The structure of the global system causes inequality and systematically higher death rates, which is caused by inequity in distribution of opportunities and resources, which is termed structural violence.

==== Definition ====
Structural violence is a term devised by Johan Galtung and liberation theologians during the 1960s to describe economic, political, legal, religious, and cultural social structures that harm and inhibit individuals, groups, and societies from reaching their full potential. Structural violence is structural because the causes of misery are "embedded in the political and economic organization of our social world; they are violent because they cause injury to people." Structural violence is different from personal or behavioral violence because it exclusively refers to preventable harm done to people by no one clear individual, but arises from unequal distribution of power and resources, pre-built into social structure. Structural violence broadly includes all kinds of violations of human dignity: absolute and relative poverty, social inequalities like gender inequality and racism, and outright displays of human rights violations. The idea of structural violence is as old as the study of conflict and violence, and so it can also be understood as related to social injustice and oppression.

==== Effects ====
Structural violence is often embedded in longstanding social structures, ubiquitous throughout the globe, that are regularized by persistent institutions and regular experience with them. These social structures seem so normal in our understanding of the world that they are almost invisible, but inequality in resource access, political power, education, healthcare, and legal standing are all possible perpetrators of structural violence. Non citizens do not have access to medical insurance and healthcare and must seek care in clinics and outpatient departments. Structural violence occurs "whenever persons are harmed, maimed, or killed by poverty and unjust social, political, and economic institutions, systems, or structures" Structural violence can contribute to worse health outcomes through either harming or killing victims, just like armed violence can have these effects. This type of unintended harm perpetuated by structural violence progressively promotes misery and hunger that eventually results in death, among other effects. Ehrlich and Ehrlich reported in 1970 that between 10 and 20 million of the 60 million annual deaths across the globe result from starvation and malnutrition. Their report also estimated that structural violence was responsible for the end of one billion lives between 1948 and 1967 in the third world.

==== Structural violence connection to health ====
Inequality in daily living conditions stem from unseen social structures and practices. This systematic inequality is produced by social norms, policies, and practices that promote the unfair distribution of power, wealth, and other social resources, such as healthcare. "The poor health of the poor, the social gradient in health within countries, and the marked health inequities between countries are caused by the unequal distribution of power, income, goods, and services, globally and nationally." First, structural violence is often a major determinant of the distribution and outcome of disease. It has been known for decades that epidemic disease is caused by structural forces. Structural violence can affect disease progression, such as in HIV, where harmful social structures profoundly affect diagnosis, staging, and treatment of HIV and associated illnesses. The determinants of disease and their outcome are set by the social factors, usually rampant with structural violence, that determine risk to be infected with the disease. Understanding how structural violence is embodied at the community, individual, and microbial levels is vital to understanding the dynamics of disease. The consequences of structural violence is post pronounced in the world's poorest countries and greatly affects the provision of clinical services in these countries. Elements of structural violence such as "social upheaval, poverty, and gender inequality decrease the effectiveness of distal services and of prevention efforts" presents barriers to medical care in countries like Rwanda and Haiti Due to structural violence, there exists a growing outcome gap where some countries have access to interventions and treatment, and countries in poverty who are neglected. With the power of improved distal interventions, the only way to close this outcome gap between countries who do and do not have access to effective treatment, lies on proximal interventions to reduce the factors contributing to health problems that arise from structural violence.

== See also ==
- Diseases of poverty
- Food Justice Movement
- Socioeconomic status and mental health
- Transit desert
- Transport divide
- Environmental racism
- Environmental Racism in the United States
