= Commercial determinants of health =

Private sector activities influencing health

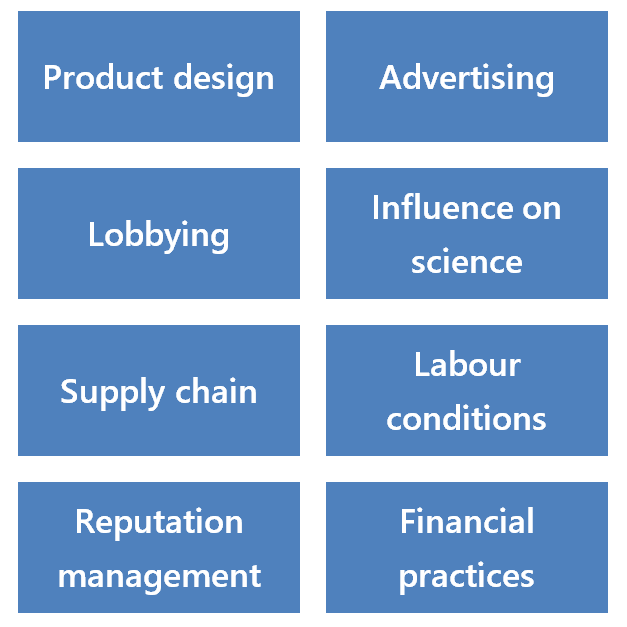
Examples of commercial determinants of health: product design, advertising, lobbying, influence on science, supply chain, labour conditions, reputation management and financial practices.

The commercial determinants of health (CDH), part of the broader social determinants of health, are the private sector activities that influence individual and group differences in health status. The term 'commercial' relates to activities intended to generate profit. Specifically, CDH scholarship is concerned with the ways that the profit-making interests of industry actors in the junk food/beverage, resource extraction, automobile, alcohol, gaming, tobacco, and ammunition industries conflict with public health.

The commercial determinants of health cover three areas of focus: unhealthy commodities that contribute to disease and poor health; business, market, and political practices that advertise these commodities and shape policy environments in their favor; and broader "global drivers" of ill-health, such as market-driven economies and globalization, that enable and reinforce these harmful practices.

== Introduction ==
Scholarship surrounding the topic emerged in 2013 when public health physician Dr. John Millar introduced the term "corporate determinants of health", referring to positive and negative influences that big corporations have on public health. The term "commercial determinants of health" entered academic discussion later in 2013, credited to West and Marteau. The term became popular after 2016 following its new definition by Kickbusch et al., who defined CDH as "strategies and approaches used by the private sector to promote products and choices that are detrimental to health".

== Factors that influence commercial determinants of health ==
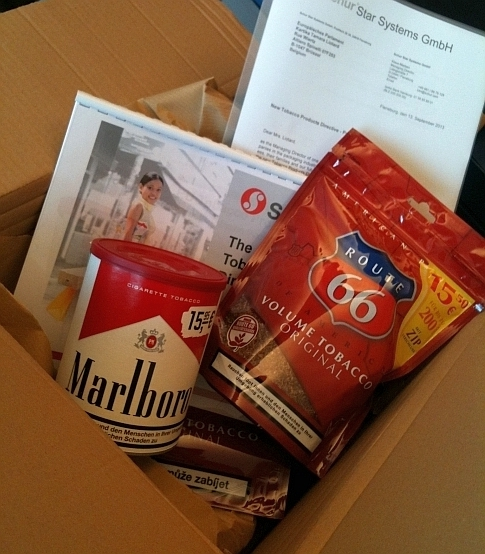
Gift from tobacco industry lobbyists to a European politician in 2013.

=== Political influence ===
Corporations routinely invest substantial resources in lobbying governments, political parties, and policy actors on matters affecting their products, often referred to as "corporate political activity (CPA). These activities typically include: forming strategic alliances with third parties (e.g media, communities, health organizations); shaping evidence through commissioned research; legal strategies; and direct lobbying or provision of financial incentive to policy makers.

CPA has been widely examined in public health scholarship, especially in regards to the tobacco industry. In the late 1990s, the release of internal tobacco industry actor documents revealed extensive strategies to block, weaken, or postpone tobacco regulation policies. Similar patterns have since been observed in the junk food/beverage, resource extraction, automobile, alcohol, gaming, tobacco, and ammunition industries.

=== Marketing ===
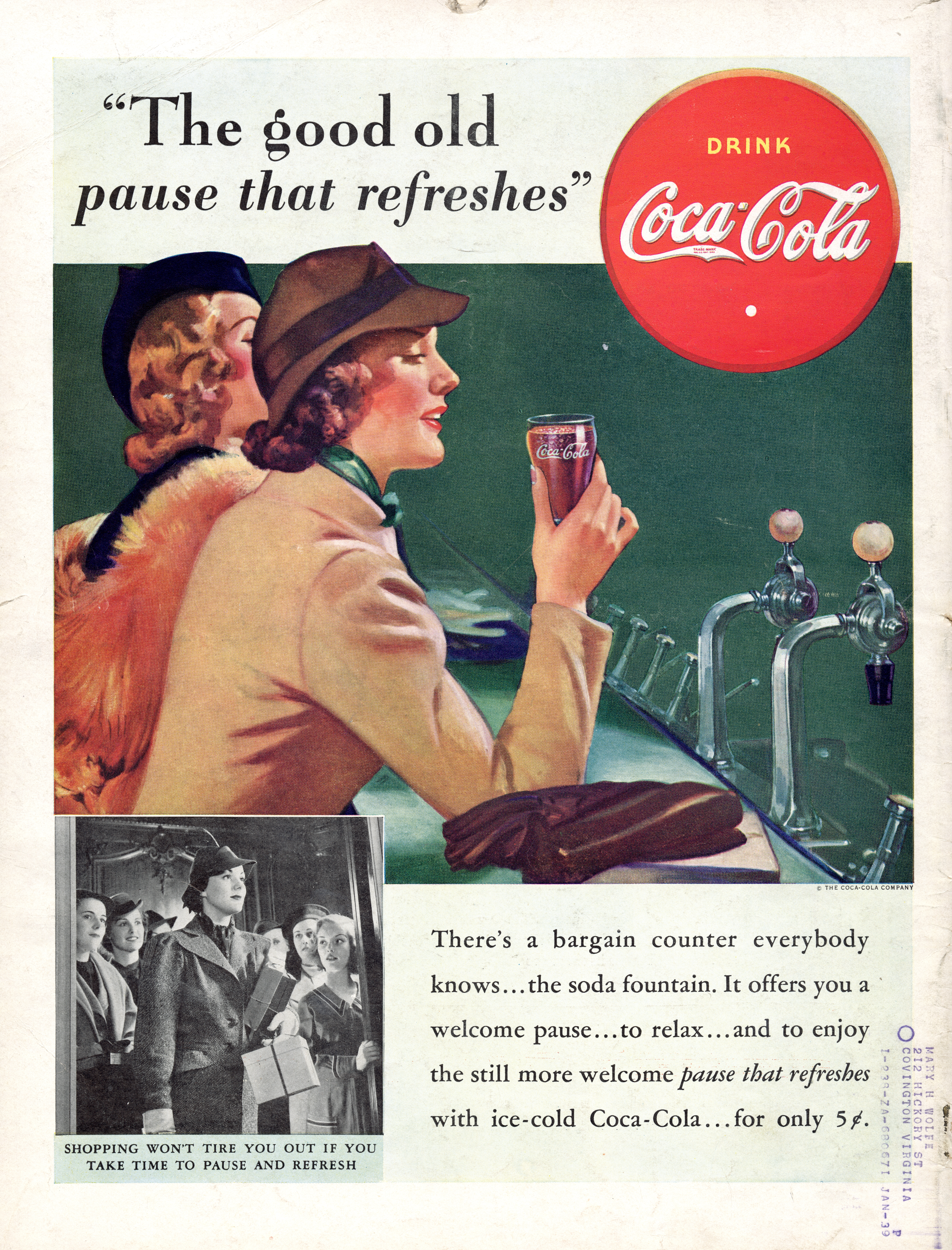
Junk food and its advertising are commercial determinants of health.

Corporations also shape health outcomes through their marketing practices, including product development, pricing decisions, advertising, and distribution. For example, research shows that the promotion of unhealthy commodities to children and adolescents leads to increased consumption, which subsequently leads to negative health impacts. In such cases, advertising aims to increase the uptake and enhance the acceptability and desirability of unhealthy commodities.

=== Supply chains ===
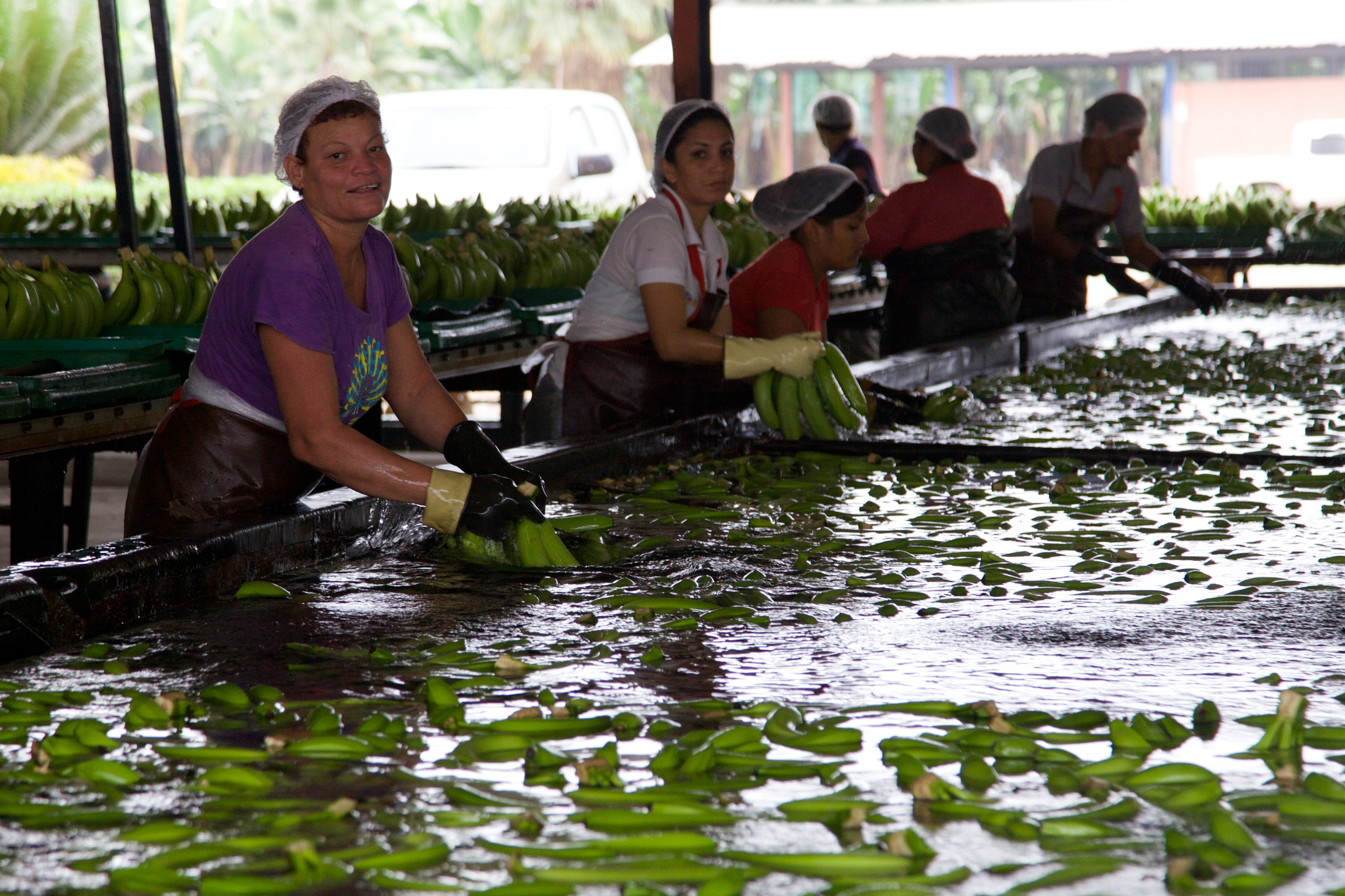
Ecuador produced 7.5 million tonnes of bananas in 2024. Agriculture employs more than a third of all people and the government has recently attempted to improve labor conditions following years of extractive practices

Corporations further extend their influence through the creation and control of large supply chains, which can boost their influence within a particular region or around the world. This is often reinforced by mergers and acquisitions that increase market concentration and consolidate power.

=== Corporate social responsibility ===
Corporate social responsibility initiatives, such as environmental programs, philanthropy, and volunteer efforts, are often used to redirect attention away from harmful corporate impacts or to repair reputation damage. Companies may create foundations or support non-governmental organization and causes that address negative impacts or issues connected to the consequences of their own products. For example, although evidence shows that excessive sugar consumption contributes to high obesity rates, a study published in the American Journal of Preventive Medicine reported that between 2011 and 2015, 96 national groups (including organizations such as the American Diabetes Association, the National Institute of Health, and the Academy of Nutrition and Dietetics) accepted sponsorships from Coca-Cola, PepsiCo, or both.

== Impact ==
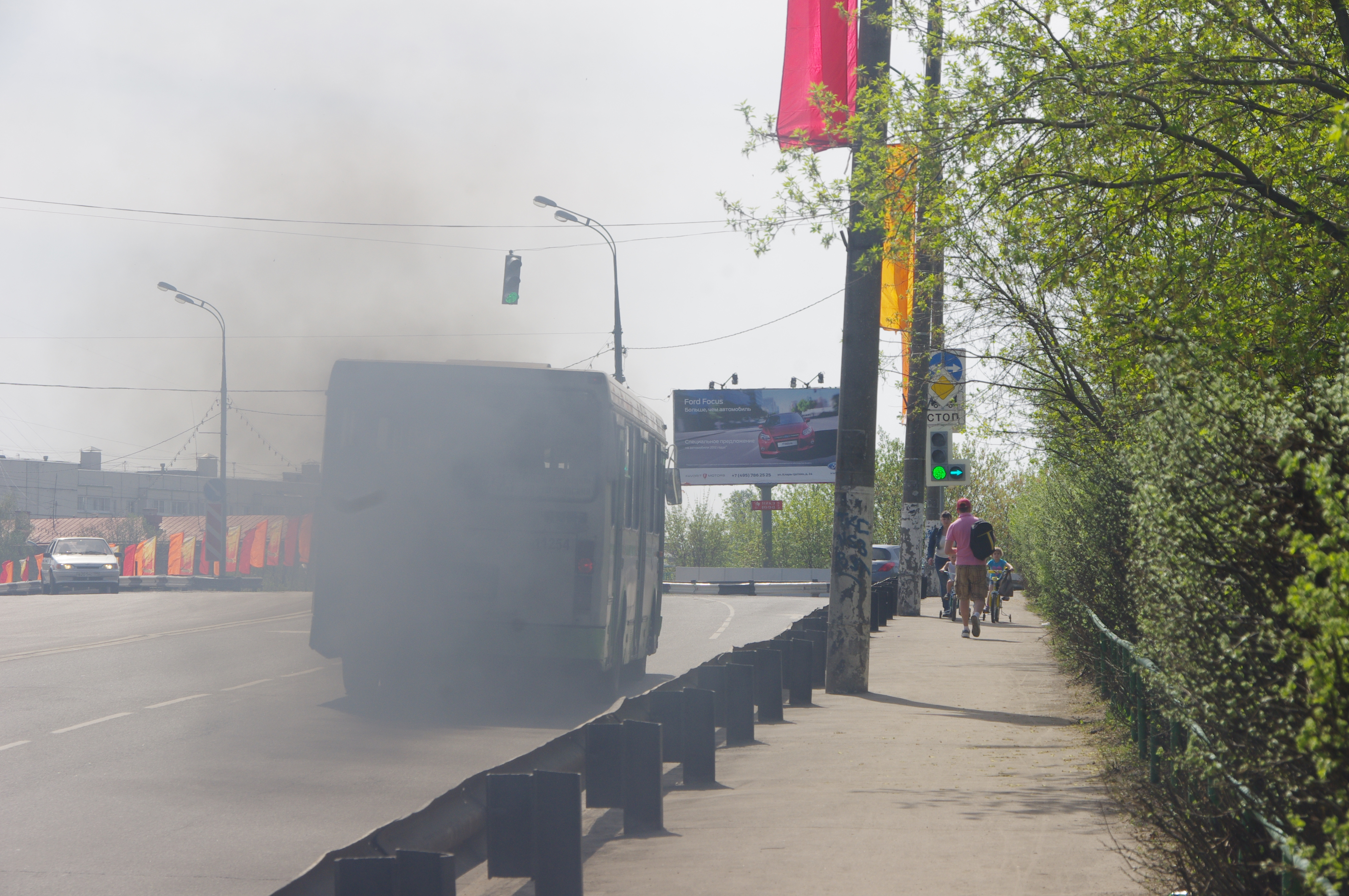
Air pollution causes 6.7 million premature deaths every year.

The main risk factors for developing non-communicable diseases (NCDs), which are responsible for 71% of all deaths and the leading cause of mortality globally, are the consumption of unhealthy diets, physical inactivity, tobacco use, and harmful alcohol drinking. 81% of these deaths are caused by 4 disease types: cardiovascular disease, cancers, diabetes, and chronic respiratory diseases. The increasing incidence and prevalence rate of NCDs is of growing public health concern—from 1990 to 2016, the percentage of NCDs amongst all global disease grew from 43% to 54%.

A fuller understanding of the commercial determinants of health and the ways risk factors interact with each other is critical for developing effective strategies to prevent NCDs. Public health approaches have long emphasized the social conditions in which people are born, grow, live, work, and age; however, as of the late 20th century, the commercial sector has played an increasingly significant role in shaping these conditions. Attention to commercial influences has grown, but current definitions and limited scholarship of CDHs do not fully capture the complex pathways between CDHs and NCDs, their variation across contexts, nor their negative impacts on specific populations, especially disadvantaged populations. As a result, the concept has not widely yet been translated into practical public health action or consensus on effective preventive action.

== See also ==
- Health policy
- Social determinants of health
- Political determinants of health
