= Chronic care management =

Chronic care management encompasses the oversight and education activities conducted by health care provider to help patients with long term illness while empowering patients to understand their condition and live successfully with it. Chronic conditions involving management can include diabetes, hypertension, lupus, multiple sclerosis, and sleep apnea. Chronic care management is equivalent to disease management for long term conditions. The work involves motivating patients to persist in necessary therapies and interventions and helping them to achieve a satisfyingly and well-begin life.

== Chronic care and the medical system ==
Historically, there has been little coordination across the multiple settings, providers and treatments of chronic illness care. In addition, the treatments for chronic diseases are often complicated, making it difficult for patients to comply with treatment protocols.

Effective medical care usually requires longer visits to the doctor's office than is common in acute care. Moreover, in treating chronic illnesses, the same intervention, whether medical or behavioral, may differ in effectiveness depending on when in the course of the illness the intervention is suggested. Fragmentation of care is a risk for patients with chronic diseases, because frequently multiple chronic diseases coexist, a phenomenon known as multimorbidity. Necessary interventions can require input from multiple specialists that may not usually work together, and to be effective, they require close, careful coordination. Research has shown that highly fragmented care for Medicare beneficiaries with multiple chronic conditions are more likely to present in emergency rooms and be admitted than others.

As a consequence, patients with chronic conditions can fare poorly in the current acute-care model of care delivery.

Historically, reimbursement has been challenging for care coordination services. Medicare recently started paying for services related to chronic care management. Medicare pays a monthly fee for patients who consent to treatment for a minimum of 20 minutes of telehealth services.

== Personal chronic care management ==
Patients with chronic conditions have an important role in the management of their conditions, as they are often the ones administering the treatments in everyday life. They also play an important role in monitoring their health and changes in their health by means of Observations of Daily Living (ODLs). Resulting information may inform both self care and clinical care.

== Importance ==
Certain problems related to chronic illness are not specifically medical, but involve patients' interactions with families and workplaces. Interventions often require patients and families to make difficult lifestyle changes. Patients need to be educated on the benefits of treatment and the risks of not properly following their treatment regimen. They need to be motivated to comply because treatment usually produces an improved state, rather than the results that most patients desire—a cure. Chronic care management helps patients systematically monitor their progress and coordinate with experts to identify and solve any problems they encounter in their treatment.

It would appear from the above, that chronically ill persons are better cared for by primary care physicians. Considering the diverse nature of chronic health problems and the roles that psychosocial environments play in their course, a purely biological model of care is usually inadequate. A study across multiple healthcare organizations has shown promising results through embracing the role of community health workers to assist vulnerable populations improve chronic disease management and care. This addition to the care team can further supplement a biopsychosocial model of care as an alternative.

== History ==
Although acute care has characterized all medical care until recently, several varieties of managed care have emerged in the past decades in an effort to improve care, reduce unnecessary service utilization and control spiraling costs. Despite its initial promise, however, managed care has not achieved truly coordinated care. In actual operation it appears to emphasize its fiscal goals. Moreover, managed care does not address the complexity of chronic conditions, and in the interests of cost-cutting, tends to reduce time with patients rather than increase it.

== Chronic care models ==
In the latter part of the 20th century, researchers began to develop care models for the assessment and treatment of the chronically ill.

Nurse researchers, such as S. Wellard, C. S. Burckhardt, C. Baker and P. N. Stern, and I. M. Lubkin and P. D. Larson, were often on the front lines of actual care for patients with ongoing treatments for conditions such as diabetes or kidney failure. They stated that their patients experienced a series of "phases", and that during some of these phases the patients responded to the same interventions quite differently.

Individuals who had chronic illnesses, such as C. Register and S. Wells, have given detailed accounts of their experiences and made recommendations about how to manage chronic conditions. Associations proliferated for those with specific conditions (Sjögren's syndrome, chronic fatigue syndrome, peripheral neuropathy, etc.), and these groups have engaged in advocacy work, acted as clearinghouses for information, and began funding research.

Edward H. Wagner, MD, MPH, Director Emeritus of The MacColl Institute for Healthcare Innovation, and former Director of The Robert Wood Johnson Foundation national program "Improving Chronic Illness Care", and Emeritus Investigator at Kaiser Permanente Washington Health Research Institute in Seattle, WA (formerly Group Health Research Institute) developed the Chronic Care Model, or CCM. The CCM summarizes the basic elements for improving care in health systems on different levels. These elements are the community, the health system, self-management support, delivery system design, decision support and clinical information systems. Evidence-based change concepts under each element, in combination, foster productive interactions between informed patients who take an active part in their care and providers with resources and expertise. The Chronic Care Model can be applied to a variety of chronic illnesses, health care settings and target populations. The bottom line is healthier patients, more satisfied providers, and cost savings.

The Stanford Self-Management Program is a community-based self-management program that helps people with chronic illness gain self-confidence in their ability to control their symptoms and manage how their health problems will affect their lives.

Partnership for Solutions, a Johns Hopkins/Robert Wood Johnson collaborative, conducts research to improve the care and quality of life for individuals with chronic health conditions.

J. O. Prochaska and his colleagues, investigating issues associated with the treatment of addictions, have described a transtheoretical model of behavior change as a process rather than an event. They have advocated assessment and treatment based on the patient's stage in the process.

Patricia Fennell, working on the experiences of imposed change (such as illness, grief, or trauma), has developed the Fennell Four Phase Model of chronic illness. Fennell says people commonly experience four phases as they learn to incorporate their changed physical abilities or psychological outlook into their personality and lifestyle: Crisis, Stabilization, Integration, and Resolution.

The Flinders Human Behaviour & Health Research Unit (based in Adelaide, South Australia) has developed the Flinders ProgramTM, a generic set of tools and processes that allows for assessment of chronic condition management behaviours, collaborative identification of problems and goal setting leading to the development of individualised care plans with the goal of raising the quality of life for people living with chronic disease. The Flinders ProgramTM has been adapted to specific contexts to meet the needs of Indigenous Australians and veterans.

Chronic care models such as the delivery of chronic disease management programs may be effective for patients with long-term chronic conditions. For patients with asthma, having a coordinated program involving multiple health care professionals can make improvements in aspects such as patients perceived quality of life, lung functioning and the severity of their asthma.

A range of studies have shown mindfulness-based pain management (MBPM) to be beneficial for those with chronic pain and other long-term conditions.

== See also ==
- Chronic care
- Disaboom
- DMAA: The Care Continuum Alliance
- Medical home
- Non-communicable diseases
