= Disease management (health) =

System of coordinated healthcare interventions and communications

Disease management is defined as "a system of coordinated healthcare interventions and communications for populations with conditions in which patient self-care efforts are significant."

For people who can access healthcare practitioners or peer support, disease management is the process whereby persons with long-term conditions (and often family/friend/carer) share knowledge, responsibility and care plans with practitioners and/or peers. To be effective it requires whole system implementation with community social support networks, a range of satisfying occupations and activities relevant to the context, clinical professionals willing to act as partners or coaches, and on-line resources which are verified and relevant to the country and context.

Knowledge sharing, knowledge building and a learning community are integral to the concept of disease management. It is a population health strategy as well as an approach to personal health. It may reduce healthcare costs and/or improve quality of life for individuals by preventing or minimizing the effects of disease, usually a chronic condition, through knowledge, skills, enabling a sense of control over life (despite symptoms of disease), and integrative care. On the other hand, it may increase health care costs by causing high implementation costs and promoting the use of costly health care interventions.

== History ==
Disease management has evolved from managed care, specialty capitation, and health service demand management, and refers to the processes and people concerned with improving or maintaining health in large populations. It is concerned with common chronic illnesses, and the reduction of future complications associated with those diseases.

Illnesses that disease management would concern itself with would include: coronary heart disease, chronic obstructive pulmonary disease (COPD), kidney failure, hypertension, heart failure, obesity, diabetes mellitus, asthma, cancer, arthritis, clinical depression, sleep apnea, osteoporosis, and other common ailments.

== Industry ==
In the United States, disease management is a large industry with many vendors. Major disease management organizations based on revenues and other criteria include Accordant (a subsidiary of Caremark), Alere (now including ParadigmHealth and Matria Healthcare), Caremark (excluding its Accordant subsidiary), Evercare, Health Dialog, Healthways, LifeMasters (now part of StayWell), LifeSynch (formerly Corphealth), Magellan, McKesson Health Solutions, and MedAssurant.

Disease management is of particular importance to health plans, agencies, trusts, associations and employers that offer health insurance. A 2002 survey found that 99.5% of enrollees of Health Maintenance Organization/Point Of Service (HMO/POS) plans are in plans that cover at least one disease management program. A Mercer Consulting study indicated that the percentage of employer-sponsored health plans offering disease management programs grew to 58% in 2003, up from 41% in 2002.

It was reported that $85 million was spent on disease management in the United States in 1997, and $600 million in 2002. Between 2000 and 2005, the compound annual growth rate of revenues for disease management organizations was 28%. In 2000, the Boston Consulting Group estimated that the U.S. market for outsourced disease management could be $20 billion by 2010; however, in 2008 the Disease Management Purchasing Consortium estimated that disease management organization revenues would be $2.8 billion by 2010. As of 2010, a study using National Ambulatory Medical Care Survey data estimated that 21.3% of patients in the U.S. with at least one chronic condition use disease management programs. Yet, management of chronic conditions is responsible for more than 75% of all health care spending.

During the 2000s, payers have then embraced disease management in many other world regions. In Europe, notable examples include Germany and France. In Germany, the first national disease management program for diabetes enrolled patients in 2003. They are funded and operated by individual sickness funds that in turn contract with regular health care providers. In France, the program Sophia for diabetic patients was introduced in 2008. It is financed and operated as a single national program by statutory health insurance, which has contracted with a private provider for support services. The introduction of these programs was in part facilitated by support from international organizations or firms and study trips or other forms of exchange with Anglo-Saxon countries.

== Process ==
The underlying premise of disease management is that when the right tools, experts, and equipment are applied to a population, labor costs (specifically: absenteeism, presenteeism, and direct insurance expenses) can be minimized in the near term, or resources can be provided more efficiently. The general idea is to ease the disease path, rather than cure the disease. Improving quality and activities for daily living are first and foremost. Improving cost, in some programs, is a necessary component, as well. However, some disease management systems believe that reductions in longer-term problems may not be measureable today, but may warrant continuation of disease management programs until better data is available in 10–20 years.

Most disease management vendors offer return on investment (ROI) for their programs, although over the years there have been dozens of ways to measure ROI. Responding to this inconsistency, an industry trade association, the Care Continuum Alliance, convened industry leaders to develop consensus guidelines for measuring clinical and financial outcomes in disease management, wellness and other population-based programs. Contributing to the work were public and private health and quality organizations, including the federal Agency for Healthcare Research and Quality, the National Committee for Quality Assurance, URAC, and the Joint Commission. The project produced the first volume of a now four-volume Outcomes Guidelines Report, which details industry-consensus approaches to measuring outcomes.

Tools include web-based assessment tools, clinical guidelines, health risk assessments, outbound and inbound call-center-based triage, best practices, formularies, and numerous other devices, systems and protocols.

Experts include actuaries, physicians, pharmacists, medical economists, nurses, nutritionists, physical therapists, statisticians, epidemiologists, and human resources professionals. Equipment can include mailing systems, web-based applications (with or without interactive modes), monitoring devices, or telephonic systems.

== Effectiveness ==
=== Possible biases ===
When disease management programs are voluntary, studies of their effectiveness may be affected by a self-selection bias; that is, a program may "attract enrollees who were [already] highly motivated to succeed". At least two studies have found that people who enroll in disease management programs differ significantly from those who do not on baseline clinical, demographic, cost, utilization and quality parameters. To minimize any bias in estimates of the effectiveness of disease management due to differences in baseline characteristics, randomized controlled trials are better than observational studies.

Even if a particular study is a randomized trial, it may not provide strong evidence for the effectiveness of disease management. A 2009 review paper examined randomized trials and meta-analyses of disease management programs for heart failure and asserted that many failed the PICO process and Consolidated Standards of Reporting Trials: "interventions and comparisons are not sufficiently well described; that complex programs have been excessively oversimplified; and that potentially salient differences in programs, populations, and settings are not incorporated into analyses."

=== Medicare ===
Section 721 of the Medicare Prescription Drug, Improvement, and Modernization Act of 2003 authorized the Centers for Medicare and Medicaid Services (CMS) to conduct what became the "Medicare Health Support" project to examine disease management. Phase I of the project involved disease management companies (such as Aetna Health Management, CIGNA Health Support, Health Dialog Services Corp., Healthways, and McKesson Health Solutions) chosen by a competitive process in eight states and the District of Columbia. The project focused on people with diabetes or heart failure who had relatively high Medicare payments; in each location, approximately 20,000 such people were randomly assigned to an intervention group and 10,000 were randomly assigned to a control group. CMS set goals in the areas of clinical quality and beneficiary satisfaction, and negotiated with the disease management programs for a target of 5% savings in Medicare costs. The programs started between August 2005 and January 2006. What is now the Care Continuum Alliance praised the project as "the first-ever national pilot integrating sophisticated care management techniques into the Medicare fee-for-service program".

An initial evaluation of Phase I of the project by RTI International appeared in June 2007 which had "three key participation and financial findings":

- Medicare expenditures for the intervention group were higher than those of the comparison group by the time the pilots started.
- Within the intervention group, participants had lower Medicare payments (i.e., tended to be healthier) than non-participants.
- The "fees paid to date far exceed any savings produced."

DMAA focused on another finding of the initial evaluation, the "high levels of satisfaction with chronic disease management services among beneficiaries and physicians". One commentary noted that the project "can only be observational" since "equivalence was not achieved at baseline". Another commentary claimed that the project was "in big trouble". A paper on the six-month evaluation, published in fall 2008, concluded that "Results to date indicate limited success in achieving Medicare cost savings or reducing acute care utilization".

In December 2007, CMS changed the financial threshold from 5% savings to budget neutrality, a change that DMAA "hailed". In January 2008, however, CMS decided to end Phase I because it claimed that the statutory authority had run out. Four U.S. senators wrote a letter to CMS to reverse its decision. DMAA decried the termination of Phase I and called upon CMS to start Phase II as soon as possible. Among other criticisms of the project, the disease management companies claimed that Medicare "signed up patients who were much sicker than they had expected," failed to transmit information on patients' prescriptions and laboratory results to them in a timely fashion, and disallowed the companies from selecting patients most likely to benefit from disease management.

By April 2008, CMS had spent $360 million on the project. The individual programs ended between December 2006 and August 2008.

The results of the program were published in The New England Journal of Medicine in November 2011. Comparing the 163,107 patients randomized to the intervention group with the 79,310 patients randomized to the control group, the researchers found that "disease-management programs did not reduce hospital admissions or emergency room visits, as compared with usual care." Furthermore, there was "no demonstrable savings in Medicare expenditures," with the net fees for disease management ranging from 3.8% to 10.9% per patient per month. The researchers suggested that the findings might be explained by the severity of chronic disease among the patients studied, delays in patients' receiving disease management after hospitalizations, and lack of integration between health coaches and the patients' primary care providers.

=== Other studies ===
Studies that have reviewed other studies on the effectiveness of disease management include the following:

- A 2004 Congressional Budget Office analysis concluded that published studies "do not provide a firm basis for concluding that disease management programs generally reduce total costs". The report caused the disease management industry to "scrambl[e] to build a better business case for their services".
- A 2005 review of 44 studies on disease management found a positive return on investment (ROI) for congestive heart failure and multiple disease conditions, but inconclusive, mixed, or negative ROI for diabetes, asthma, and depression management programs. The lead author, of Cornell University and Thomson Medstat, was quoted as saying that the paucity of research conducted on the ROI of disease management was "a concern because so many companies and government agencies have adopted disease management to manage the cost of care for people with chronic conditions."
- A 2007 RAND summary of 26 reviews and meta-analyses of small-scale disease management programs, and 3 evaluations of population-based disease management programs, concluded that "Payers and policy makers should remain skeptical about vendor claims [concerning disease management] and should demand supporting evidence based on transparent and scientifically sound methods." In specific:
  - Disease management improved "clinical processes of care" (e.g., adherence to evidence-based guidelines) for congestive heart failure, coronary artery disease, diabetes, and depression.
  - There was inconclusive evidence, insufficient evidence, or evidence for no effect of disease management on health-related behaviors.
  - Disease management led to better disease control for congestive heart failure, coronary artery disease, diabetes, and depression.
  - There was inconclusive evidence, insufficient evidence, or evidence for no effect of disease management on clinical outcomes (e.g., "mortality and functional status").
  - Disease management reduced hospital admission rates for congestive heart failure, but increased health care utilization for depression, with inconclusive or insufficient evidence for the other diseases studied.
  - In the area of financial outcomes, there was inconclusive evidence, insufficient evidence, evidence for no effect, or evidence for increased costs.
  - Disease management increased patient satisfaction and health-related quality of life in congestive heart failure and depression, but the evidence was insufficient for the other diseases studied.

A subsequent letter to the editor claimed that disease management might nevertheless "satisfy buyers today, even if academics remain unconvinced".

- A 2008 systematic review and meta-analysis concluded that disease management for COPD "modestly improved exercise capacity, health-related quality of life, and hospital admissions, but not all-cause mortality".
- A 2009 review of 27 studies "could not draw definitive conclusions about the effectiveness or cost-effectiveness of... asthma disease-management programs" for adults.
- A Canadian systematic review published in 2009 found that home telehealth in chronic disease management may be cost-saving but that "the quality of the studies was generally low."
- Researchers from The Netherlands systematically reviewed 31 papers published 2007–09 and determined that the evidence that disease management programs for four diseases reduce healthcare expenditures is "inconclusive."
- A meta-analysis of randomized trials published through 2009 estimated that disease management for diabetes has "a clinically moderate but significant impact on hemoglobin A_{1C} levels," with an absolute mean difference of 0.51% between experimental and control groups.
- A 2011 "meta-review" (systematic review of meta-analyses) of heart failure disease management programs found them to be of "mixed quality" in that they did not report important characteristics of the studies reviewed.
- A 2015 systematic review of randomised controlled trials examining the impact of chronic disease management programmes for adults with asthma, found that having a coordinated program approach with multiple health care professionals compared with usual care can positively impact on the severity of asthma, can improve lung function and also perceived quality of life.

Studies not reviewed in the aforementioned papers include the following:

- A U.K. study published in 2007 found certain improvements in the care of patients with coronary artery disease and heart failure (e.g., better management of blood pressure and cholesterol) if they received nurse-led disease management instead of usual care.
- In a 2007 Canadian study, people were randomized to receive or not receive disease management for heart failure for a period of six months. Emergency department visits, hospital readmissions, and all-cause deaths were no different in the two groups after 2.8 years of follow-up.
- A 2008 U.S. study found that nurse-led disease management for patients with heart failure was "reasonably cost-effective" per quality-adjusted life year compared with a "usual care group".
- A 2008 study from the Netherlands compared no disease management with "basic" nurse-led disease management with "intensive" nurse-led disease management for patients discharged from the hospital with heart failure; it detected no significant differences in hospitalization and death for the three groups of patients.
- A retrospective cohort study from 2008 found that disease management did not increase the use of drugs recommended for patients after a heart attack.
- Of 15 care coordination (disease management) programs followed for two years in a 2008 study, "few programs improved patient behaviors, health, or quality of care" and "no program reduced gross or net expenditures".
- After 18 months, a 2008 Florida study found "virtually no overall impacts on hospital or emergency room (ER) use, Medicare expenditures, quality of care, or prescription drug use" for a disease management program.
- With minor exceptions, a paper published in 2008 did not find significant differences in outcomes among people with asthma randomly assigned to telephonic disease management, augmented disease management (including in-home respiratory therapist visits), or traditional care.
- A 2009 review by the Centers for Medicare and Medicaid Services of 35 disease management programs that were part of demonstration projects between 1999 and 2008 found that relatively few improved quality in a budget-neutral manner.
- In a 2009 randomized trial, high- and moderate-intensity disease management did not improve smoking cessation rates after 24 months compared with drug therapy alone.
- A randomized trial published in 2010 determined that disease management reduced a composite score of emergency department visits and hospitalizations among patients discharged from Veterans Administration hospitals for chronic obstructive pulmonary disease. A 2011 post-hoc analysis of the study's data estimated that the intervention produced a net cost savings of $593 per patient.
- A Spanish study published in 2011 randomized 52 people hospitalized for heart failure to follow-up with usual care, 52 to home visits, 52 to telephone follow-up, and 52 to an in-hospital heart failure unit. After a median of 10.8 months of follow-up, there were no significant differences in hospitalization or mortality among the four groups.
- Among 18- to 64-year-old people with chronic diseases receiving Medicaid, telephone-based disease management in one group of members did not reduce ambulatory care visits, hospitalizations, or expenditures relative to a control group. Furthermore, in this 2011 study, the group receiving disease management had a lower decrease in emergency department visits than the group not receiving disease management.

== See also ==
- Ambulatory care sensitive conditions
- Chronic care management
- Expert Patient Programme
- Disaboom
- Medical case management
