= ODL =

ODL may refer to:

- Observations of daily living, cues that people attend to in the course of their everyday life, that inform them about their health
- Oklahoma Department of Libraries, the state library for the U.S. state of Oklahoma
- Open and distance learning, gratis distance education
- Ordnance Datum Liverpool, an ordnance datum recorded at Victoria Dock in Liverpool, England
- OpenDaylight Project, a software-defined networking (SDN) controller
