= Living with Fibromyalgia =

Living with Fibromyalgia: A Journey of Hope and Understanding
- Directed by: Stephen Eyer
- Written by: Daneen Akkers, Stephen Eyer
- Produced by: Daneen Akers, Stephen Eyer
- Distributed by: Trillusion Media
- Release date: March 22, 2007
- Running time: 71 mins
- Language: English

Living with Fibromyalgia: A Journey of Hope and Understanding is a 2007 documentary film by Stephen Eyer and Daneen Akers from Trillusion Media, Inc. The documentary has been called the first feature-length film that explores the chronic pain condition known as fibromyalgia.

== Background ==
The film was created by Pacific Union College faculty members Daneen Akers and Stephen Eyer as a resource for fibromyalgia patients and their families and to help create awareness about the condition. It tells the stories of seven fibromyalgia patients. Interwoven with the patient stories are interviews with experts from the Fibromyalgia Rehabilitation Program at Cedars-Sinai Medical Center in Los Angeles, California. On their website, the filmmakers call Living with Fibromyalgia "the film they wished their family could have watched together when they first heard the word fibromyalgia."

The filmmakers stated that they would donate 10 percent of all sales of the film to the National Fibromyalgia Association to support fibromyalgia research and education.

When interviewed by Jennifer Prokopy, the editor and founder of an on online resource for women with chronic illnesses called ChronicBabe.com, filmmaker Daneen Akers shared her reasons for creating the film and revealed that she sold her house as part of fundraising efforts.

== Release ==
The film first screened on November 18, 2006, at the Dodge College of Film's Folino Theatre at Chapman University in Orange, California. Hosted by The National Fibromyalgia Association and Trillusion Media, the film had its world première in San Diego on March 22, 2007, at the Hillcrest Landmark Theatre. The documentary was screened, with free admission, around the United States as part of the National Fibromyalgia Association's May, 2007 Fibromyalgia Awareness Day campaign.
