= Patricia Fennell =

American businesswoman

Patricia A. Fennell is the chief executive officer of Albany Health Management Associates. She is a clinician, research scientist, educator, and author specializing in chronic illness, chronic and post-viral syndromes, trauma, forensics, hospice, global health care concerns, autoimmune and post-viral disease, clinical education, and training.

== Education and experience ==
Fennell graduated from The College of Saint Rose in New York State with an undergraduate sociology degree, and received her graduate degree in social work from the State University of New York at Albany.

She began her career in social work in the hospice setting. She determined that the care given to the dying could be applied to individuals with chronic illnesses. In the course of time she concentrated on working, supporting, and creating a new treatment approach for chronic syndromes. Her clinical experience with individuals in managing chronic illness, other works, and publications, have earned her a reputation as an expert in the field according to a review of Fennell's book; Managing Chronic Illness, published in Psychiatric Services. Fennell is CEO of Albany Health Management, Inc. Her company provides counselling, consulting, professional education, and doctoral training for the State University of New York. She also engages in collaborative international research using her empirically verified "Four-Phase Model".

== Four Phase Model ==
Fennell created the Four Phase Model as a framework to help clinicians comprehend and manage the integration of the experiences of patients with chronic illnesses. The four phases are crisis, stabilization, resolution, and integration. She explains that her model allows for therapeutic intervention in a flexible phase-specific manner so that individuals may integrate their illness into a meaningful life despite physical limitations. An integrated systems approach is utilized to include all aspects of an individual's chronic illness; physical/behavioral, psychological, and social/interactive. The model recognizes a patient's needs early in chronic illness may differ from the needs in later years, and may affect various responses to treatment, be it medical or psychosocial. Study results suggest that Fennell's model accurately describes the phases of illness adaptation that persons with chronic fatigue syndrome (CFS) experience, and that phase models may help researchers understand disparate results seen in CFS research studies. The model may also be a useful tool for lifestyle modification in age management. Physicians, nurses, psychologists, and social workers are instructed in her courses on how to apply her approach to patients.

== Affiliations ==
- Fennell collaborates with DePaul University's Chronic Illness Initiative on issues related to chronically ill college students. A training program led by administrators and faculty of DePaul and Albany Health Management Associates teaches educational institutions how to develop policies and deliver services to students with chronic illnesses. The program is based on the FFPT model of chronic illness and DePaul's Chronic Illness Initiative support services model.
- Board of Directors of the International Association for Chronic Fatigue Syndrome and ME.
- Editorial Board of the Journal of Chronic Fatigue Syndrome.
- Allied Healthcare Advisory Committee for the Centers for Disease Control and Prevention (CDC).
- Professional Advisory Board of FibroAction (UK).
- Medical Advisory Panel for the Fibromyalgia Support Group for Surrey and Sussex (UK).
- Advisory board of the National Fibromyalgia Association.

== Bibliography ==
=== Books ===
- The Chronic Illness Workbook: Strategies and Solutions for Taking Back Your Life, Revised Ed., 2012
- Managing Chronic Illness Using the Four-Phase Treatment Approach.
- Co-editor and co-author of Handbook of Chronic Fatigue Syndrome.
- The chapter on "Chronic Illness" for Encyclopedia of Social Work.
- The Chronic Illness Workbook: Strategies and Solutions for Taking Back Your Life.

=== Selected articles ===
- Elements of Suffering in Myalgic Encephalomyelitis/Chronic Fatigue Syndrome: The Experience of Loss, Grief, Stigma, and Trauma in the Severely and Very Severely Affected, Healthcare 2021 by Patricia A. Fennell, Nancy Dorr, and Shane S. George
- CFS, The Four Progressive Stages of the CFS Experience: A Coping Tool for Patients
- CFS, Sociocultural Influences and Trauma: Clinical Considerations

=== Selected lectures and conferences ===
- "The Invisible Struggle: Understanding the World of the Chronically Ill Student" Keynote Presentation by Patricia Fennell: DePaul University School for New Learning.
- Presentation of the Fennell Four Phase Treatment (FFPT) approach to the U.S. Department of Health and Human Services Chronic Fatigue Syndrome Advisory Committee.

== Certification program ==
Fennell offers a certification program through Advocate Program/American Association of Community Justice Professionals; it teaches people to apply her teachings to trauma survivors.
