= Lorig =

Lorig is a surname. Notable people with the surname include:

- Erik Lorig (born 1986), American football player
- Joe Lorig (born 1973), American football coach
- Kate Lorig (born 1942), American registered nurse and professor
- Khatuna Lorig (born 1974), American archer of Georgian origin
