= Patient education =

Teaching or training of patients concerning their own health needs

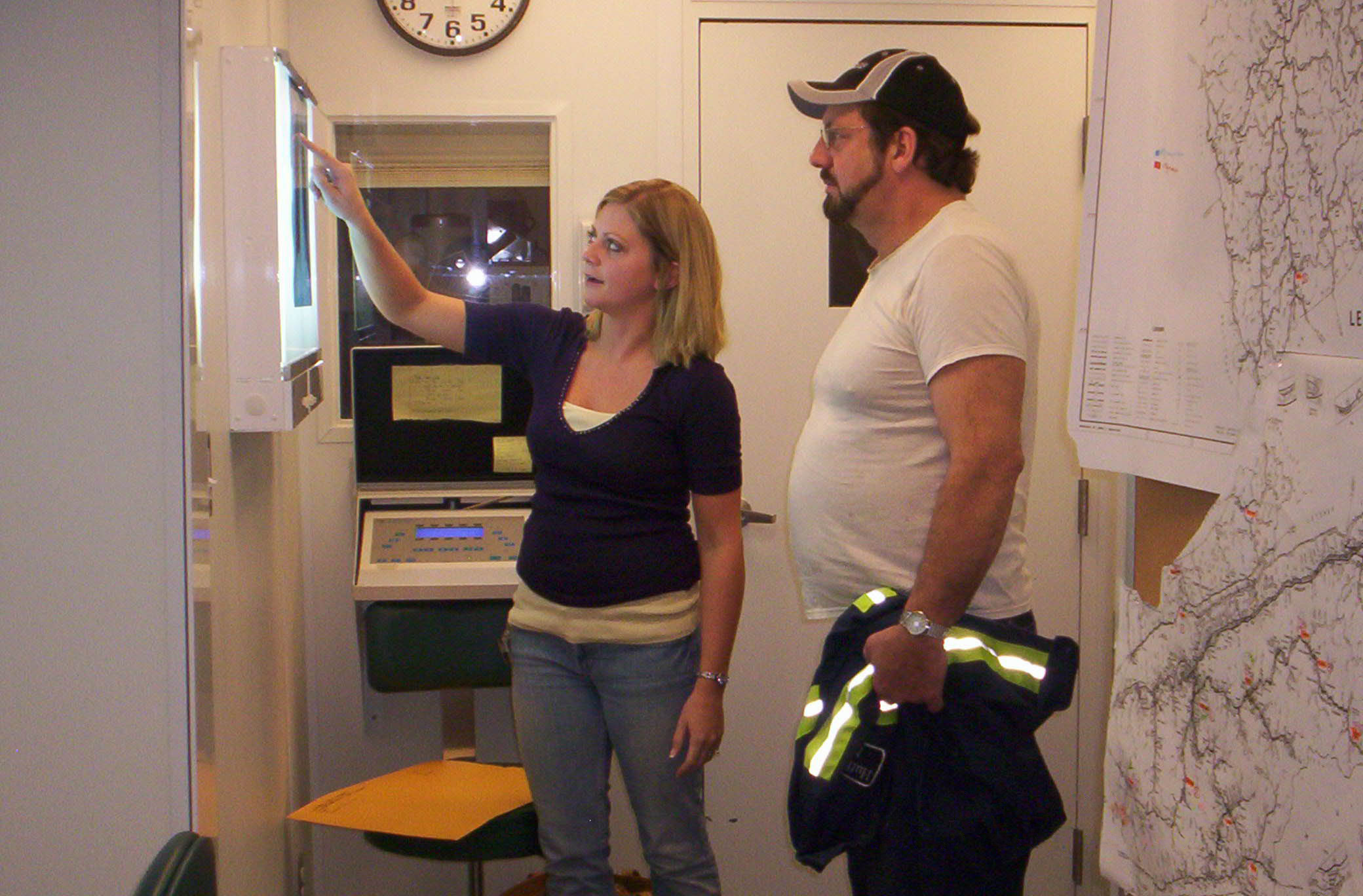
A Radiographer explains an x-ray to a coal miner participating in screening. Patient education can include explaining the results of diagnostic tests.

Patient education is a planned interactive learning process designed to support and enable expert patients to manage their life with a disease and/or optimise their health and well-being.

== Overview ==
Education may be provided by any healthcare professional who has undertaken appropriate training education, education on patient communication and education is usually included in the healthcare professional's training. However, further training is required to develop specialist skills needed to facilitate self-management and behaviour change. Patient education provided by a healthcare professional can often be more effective than other methods such as medication guides. Many institutions are calling for courses in educating medical students in Technical Communication to promote Patient Education and the subsequent benefits thereof.

Health education is also a tool used by managed care plans, and may include both general preventive education or health promotion and disease or condition specific education. Some topics proposed in Patient Education courses include Technical and Professional Communication (TPC) and Rhetoric of Health and Medicine (RHM) in order to prepare Health educators to create simple and culturally sensitive avenues of communication.

== Patient-centered education ==
Important elements of patient education are skill building and responsibility: patients need to know when, how, and why they need to make a lifestyle change. Romanova et al. (2024) reviewed findings of interventions that improve health and literacy among the disadvantaged groups. They recommend that educators have more participatory approaches, with education material appropriate to specific cultures, and emphasizing critical health literacy.While another review by Larson et al. (2022) found after an examination of chronic conditioned patients, the importance of more consistent research methods and ways to measure. These findings suggest that patient education can be improved if educational approaches are adapted towards the patients needs, health conditions, cultural background, and the level of health literacy.

The value of patient education can be summarized as follows:

- Improved understanding of medical condition, diagnosis, disease, or disability.
- Improved understanding of methods and means to manage multiple aspects of medical condition.
- Improved self-advocacy in deciding to act both independently from medical providers and in interdependence with them.
- Improved initiative in voicing concerns over medication delivery, risks, and dosages with a physician.
- Improve trust between a patient and their provider through effective and clear communication.
- Increased adherence – Effective communication and patient education increases patient motivation to adhere to treatments.
- Patient outcomes – Patients more likely to respond well to their treatment plan – fewer complications.
- Informed consent – Patients feel you've provided the information they need to make informed decisions
- Empowered to make shared decision - Patients understanding of the evidence of benefits and risks of interventions, helps them to truly weigh the trade-offs they are (un)willing to make.
- Increased health literacy and confidence to navigate the health systems.
- Utilization – More effective use of medical services – fewer unnecessary phone calls and visits.
- Satisfaction and referrals – Patients more likely to stay with your practice and refer other patients.
- Risk Management – Lower risk of malpractice when patients have realistic expectations.
- Race and health – Target education to help reduce the disproportionate burden on populations at increase risk of mortailty.

== Health Educators ==
The competencies of a health educator include the following:

- Incorporate a personal ethic in regards to social responsibilities and services towards others.
- Provide accurate, competent, and evidence-based care.
- Practice preventive health care.
- Focus on relationship-centered care with individuals and their families.
- Incorporate the multiple determinants of health when providing care.
- Be culturally sensitive and be open to a diverse society.
- Use technology appropriately and effectively.
- Be current in the field and continue to advance education.

== Outcomes ==
There are many areas where patient education can improve the outcomes of treatment.

- For example, in patients with amputations, patient education has been shown to be effective when approached from all angles by the healthcare team (nurse, primary care physician, prosthetist, physical therapist, occupational therapist etc.). Support groups have been shown to be a helpful method for dealing with depression in this population. Preoperative patient education helped patients with their decision-making process by informing them of factors related to pain, limb loss, and functional restriction faced after amputation.
- In the case of arthritis, patient education was found to be administered through three methods, including individual face to face meetings with healthcare professionals, patient groups, online support programs. Category I evidence was found for individual, face to face counselling. Meeting with rheumatologists, occupational therapists, physical therapists, nurses, and other healthcare providers was found to be effective in creating adherence to treatment, medication, and for improving overall patient health.
- In the case of rheumatoid arthritis, patient education has been shown as an effective non-pharmacological treatment. It is recommended that patient education should be the start point and underpin all self-management interventions.
- The role of patient organisations in providing support and structured guidance for people with arthritis is widely valued by professionals and patients.
- It is important to consider patient factors that may help improve outcomes of patient education patient. These are patient activation, illness perceptions, anxiety, participants' knowledge about their condition, engagement with routine check-ups and positive health behaviours. These factors may be also be targets for patient education.

== See also ==
- Expert Patient Programme
- Compliance (medicine)
- Cultural competence in healthcare
- Green prescription
- Managed care
- Medical writing
- Orem model of nursing
