= DMAA =

DMAA may refer to

- Methylhexanamine, also known as 1,3-dimethylamylamine, a dietary supplement
- DMAA: The Care Continuum Alliance, a United States health industry trade association
