= Population health policies and interventions =

Aspect of health science and policy

Population health, a field which focuses on the improvement of the health outcomes for a group of individuals, has been described as consisting of three components: "health outcomes, patterns of health determinants, and policies and interventions". Policies and Interventions define the methods in which health outcomes and patterns of health determinants are implemented. Policies which are helpful "improve the conditions under which people live". Interventions encourage healthy behaviors for individuals or populations through "program elements or strategies designed to produce behavior changes or improve health status".

Policies and interventions are needed due to the inequalities amongst populations and the inconsistent way care is administered. Policies can include "necessary community and personal social and health services" as well as taxes on alcohol and soft drinks and implement smoking cessation policies. Interventions can include therapeutic or preventative health care and may also include actions taken by the individual or by someone on behalf of the individual. The application of population health is determined by the policies and interventions which can be implemented within an organization, city, state or country.

== Common methodology ==
Countries, states, provinces and providers across the globe are shifting towards better systems to respond to inconsistent health outcomes, mitigate decreasing margins and replace outdated methods such as fee-for-service health delivery. Payment model reforms, including the Accountable Care Organization (ACO), provide roadmaps for healthcare reform and drive many of its constituents towards more effective and innovative means for improving health outcomes. Population health management is a common approach for resolving these challenges but it involves new methods, tools, systems and implementations to correct inefficiencies and improve health outcomes.

Population health tools and computer systems include data exchange, large datasets, and advanced software which are used to supply data scientists and research teams with appropriate information which can then be used by policy makers and change agents. This method helps to set policies around population health as well as intervention strategies which are then used to respond to the needs of a population.

== Policies and policymakers ==
Policy for population health "sets priorities" and are a "guide to action to change what would otherwise occur". Policies are based on "social sciences of sociology, economics, demography, public health, anthropology, and epidemiology" and determine how outcomes can be accomplished are implemented at various levels. Such guides determine laws, policies, and ordinances and are defined by policymakers. Examples of policies include "smoking bans, excise taxes on cigarettes and alcohol, seat belt laws, water fluoridation, and restaurant menu labeling". They may be applied to a commercial establishment such as a restaurant, business workplace or within a city or state level. Policies should be evidence based and require academic studies or research to support the approach. This will assure that the appropriate measures needed for each demographic are promoted to encourage the necessary intervention practices which can be applied to each population or to the nation as a whole.

Policymakers can be classified as both private and public and are defined as someone who is in a position of authority to implement health policies. A public policy maker could be a government official and a private policymaker could be a business owner or administrator. Policymakers are influenced by, and can also be, change agents. Change agents include "legislators in Washington, an attorney general, regulators at the FDA, an advocacy group or other organizations that clearly have influence".

== Political strategy ==
The goal for any political strategies surrounding population health is to "improve chances of success for policy adoption and implementation". Such strategies include the creation of funds to support initiatives and the construction of strategies which limit conflicts of interest in the implementation of public policy.

=== Tobacco control ===
A political strategy implemented to limit the sale and exposure to tobacco products and restrict the tobacco company's ability to benefit politically from charitable donations is the creation of the World Health Framework Convention on Tobacco Control (FCTC) treaty. The legally binding document is supported by numerous countries, government/nongovernment agencies and provides the necessary power to prevent negative influences on population health policies.

== Interventions ==
Interventions in population health "shift the distribution of health risk by addressing the underlying social, economic and environmental conditions" and are implemented through "programs or policies designed and developed in the health sector, but they are more likely to be in sectors elsewhere, such as education, housing or employment". They are aimed at reducing such things as childhood obesity, cardiovascular disease, smoking and mental health issues throughout society. The means in which interventions are devised is through extensive research and contributions from medical scientists, researchers, and medical professionals. They are implemented by but are not limited to educators, practicing physicians, business administrators and mental health professionals.

== Approaches and implementations ==
A typical approach includes assessing the conditions and possible improvements which can be made within the social determinants that have been identified. Each approach is handled at a state or health plan level.

One example was a workplace in China which implemented policies and interventions for their staff to fight depression. By recognizing the importance of mental health, they were able to reduce depression and improve job satisfaction across the company. The company published its research and findings to promote "enterprises taking more responsibility for the provision of mental health services to their employees".

Another example was the implementation of a smoking cessation program to the province of Ontario. Studies were performed on weekly visit rates to psychiatric emergency departments before and after the implementation. The result was a "15.5% reduction in patient visits for patients with a primary diagnosis of psychotic disorder".

== Inequalities and variance of implementation ==
As is the common understanding of population health, health inequalities, defined as a "generic term used to designate differences, variations, and disparities in the health achievements of individuals and groups", must be considered to correctly implement the most effective policies and interventions. Based on a population and its socioeconomic, geographic, ethnicity and other factors, policies and interventions may vary. Policies implemented for one population may be less effective and more costly than it would be for another similar population. For example, US policies tend to be more costly than European and have less impact. Research has shown that in some instances, "Americans had worse outcomes than their international peers" and also had "the lowest life expectancy at birth of the countries studied".

== See also ==
- Population health
- Community health
- Economic inequality
- Health disparities
- Health impact assessment
- Inequality in disease
- List of countries by income equality
- Social determinants of health
- Sin tax
- Sugary drinks tax
- WHO Framework Convention on Tobacco Control (FCTC)
