= Care Continuum Alliance =

US industry trade group

- Care Continuum Alliance logo
- Formation: 1999-03-01
- Legal status: Association
- Headquarters: Washington, DC
- Coordinates: 38.894624°N 77.022593°W
- Region served: Worldwide
- Members: Organizations & individuals
- Main organ: Board of directors
- Website: www.carecontinuum.org

The Care Continuum Alliance (formerly DMAA: The Care Continuum Alliance) is an industry trade group of corporations and individuals that "promotes the role of population health improvement in raising the quality of care, improving health outcomes and reducing preventable health care costs for individuals with chronic conditions and those at risk for developing chronic conditions". It supports "care continuum services" such as "health and wellness promotion, disease management, and care coordination" by means of "advocacy, research, and the promotion of best practices in care management".

== Current structure ==
The Care Continuum Alliance "represents more than 200 corporate and individual stakeholders". Membership categories include:

- Population health management organizations (e.g., wellness and health promotion organizations; disease and care management organizations; home health, nursing home and elderly care organizations; behavioral health organizations; pharmaceutical or biotech organizations; health information technology companies; pharmacy benefit managers; and third party administrators)
- Health plans and integrated delivery systems (e.g., health insurers; health maintenance organizations; preferred provider organizations; Medicare Advantage plans; and Medicaid plans)
- Physician groups and hospitals
- Partner organizations
- International organizations
- Individuals (e.g., government employees; academicians; allied health professionals; and full-time students)

The Care Continuum Alliance is governed by a Board of Directors and a structure of committees, subcommittees and work groups. The organization maintains a professional staff in Washington, D.C., to perform day-to-day administration. In 2008, the Care Continuum Alliance reported that it paid $80,000 in lobbying expenses to Sonnenschein Nath & Rosenthal.

== History ==
The organization was formed in March 1999 as the Disease Management Association of America (DMAA). Its stated purpose was "educating the health care industry, government, employers and the general public about the important role that disease management programs play in improving health care quality and outcomes for people with chronic conditions". The organization's first President was Al Lewis, who described an "irreversible trend toward more disease management" but with some barriers such as state privacy laws.

In early 2003, the Care Continuum Alliance hired Baker, Donelson, Bearman, Caldwell & Berkowitz to advocate for its interests in the U.S. executive and legislative branches. The Medicare Prescription Drug, Improvement, and Modernization Act passed later that year was described as a "major victory" for the Care Continuum Alliance and the firm, in that the law "authoriz[ed] payment for services provided by its [i.e., the Alliance's] members to people with chronic illnesses".

In December 2006, the title of the top position of the Board of Directors changed from "President" to "Chairman," and the chief staff officer's title changed from "Executive Director" to "President and Chief Executive Officer (CEO)". Tracey Moorhead, the current President and CEO, has been quoted in the newsmedia concerning not only the Care Continuum Alliance but also chronic conditions in general.

As part of a three-year rebranding to its current name, the organization announced a transitional name change ("DMAA: The Care Continuum Alliance") and new mission in September 2007 to reflect the expansion among its membership to services and products along the entire care continuum—from workplace wellness and prevention to disease management and more complex interventions.

Also in 2007, the Care Continuum Alliance redefined this expanded care focus as "population health improvement" and published its "population health improvement model" to document the change.

== Major publications ==
Among the Care Continuum Alliance's notable publications are:

=== Outcomes Guidelines Report (2006, 2007, 2008, 2009, 2010) ===
In recent years, Care Continuum Alliance research activities have focused heavily on measuring outcomes in population-based interventions, such as wellness and care management. These activities were conducted at least partly in response to a 2004 Congressional Budget Office analysis that concluded that published studies "do not provide a firm basis for concluding that such programs generally reduce total costs".

In 2006, the group initiated a project to build industry consensus on measuring clinical and financial outcomes in wellness and population health management and published the first volume of its oft-cited Outcomes Guidelines Report in December of that year. The usefulness of the first volume was questioned because the guidelines were voluntary in nature and "equivocate[d] on a number of key issues, preventing true standardization even if they were adopted industry wide". In September 2007, the Care Continuum Alliance produced a second volume, with a greater emphasis on clinical outcomes (the first had focused mainly on financial measures). The organization released third and fourth volumes of its guidelines in 2008 and 2009, respectively. Volume 3 continued a "collaboration with NCQA and other contributors to expand and refine measures in all areas—in particular, methods and measures that allow meaningful comparisons across programs". The Care Continuum Alliance released a fifth volume of the guidelines Oct. 14, 2010, at its 2010 annual meeting, in Washington, D.C.

=== Population Health Improvement: A Market Survey Report (2010) ===
This market analysis collected responses from 135 purchasers and providers of health and wellness services and explored a variety of metrics, such as intervention types, use of incentives and measures of success. The analysis also examines market trends, including purchasing expectations, insourcing versus outsourcing of services and use of integrated data platforms. The survey found that 73 percent of purchasers planned to offer population health improvement programs within the 12 months following the survey's release and that 76 percent planned to do so by the end of 2011. Of those already purchasing programs, 84 percent expected additional purchases.

=== Disease Management and Wellness: Results of a Market Research Survey (2008) ===
Among other findings, this survey of health plans, employers, and disease management and wellness program providers determined that "84% of health plans and employers offer one or more wellness programs" and that "diabetes, coronary artery disease and asthma represent the top three conditions for disease management program enrolment".

=== Participant Satisfaction Survey (2006) ===
Developed with support from J. D. Power and Associates, this tool consists of four modules on "access to care, coordination of care, improvements to quality of life and ability to self-manage chronic conditions". A report prepared for the Agency for Healthcare Research and Quality cites the survey tool as a potential measure for patient self-management support programs.

=== Dictionary of Disease Management Terminology (2004, 2006) ===
The first (2004) edition of this book defined 126 terms related to disease management. The second edition appeared in 2006.

== Media accounts ==
- Eisenberg, Daniel (2001-08-20). "Take Your Medicine," Time magazine.
- Fruedenheim, Milt (2002-02-17). "MONEY & MEDICINE; Bedside Visits, on the Telephone," New York Times.
- (2002-12-29). "Corporate Corner," St. Paul Pioneer-Press.
- (2003-09-03) "Cost control quest leads to disease management," Employee Benefit Adviser.
- Uhlman, Marian (2003-12-29). "Patients' failure to take medicines undermines medical advances," The Philadelphia Inquirer.
- Mulder, James T. (2004-02-08) "Health Works! Employers Take the Lead in Encouraging Wellness and Helping Workers Manage Chronic Disease," The Post-Standard (Syracuse, N.Y.).
- Belli, Anne (2004-12-28). "Programs aim to control health-care costs by managing diabetes, other diseases," Houston Chronicle.
- Carroll, John (2004). "DM Standards Off and Crawling," Managed Care magazine.
- ElBoghdady, Dina (2005-08-02). "A Nurse's Healing Touch, by Telephone; Medicare Program Uses Call Centers," The Washington Post, page D-4.
- Glabman, Maureen (2005). "12 DM Trends You Should Know About," Managed Care magazine.
- (2006-03-27). "Excellent health benefits help attract, retain top employees," San Diego Business Journal.
- Glabman, Maureen (2006). "'Take My Word for It': The Enduring Dispute Over Measuring DM's Economic Value," Managed Care magazine.
- Butler, Kelley (2007-01-05). "Solving a benefits Sudoku," Employee Benefit News.
- Willett, Hugh G. (2007-04-20). "30 percent of employers offer wellness programs; more planned," Knoxville News-Sentinel.
