= Kate Lorig =

Professor

Dr. Kate Lorig
- Born: 1942 (age 83–84)
- Education: Boston University (B.S. Nursing), University of California, San Francisco (M.S. Nursing), University of California, Berkeley (Ph.D.)
- Occupation: registered nurse
- Known for: Author, work on chronic disease and patient education

Dr. Kate Lorig, Dr.P.H., is an American professor at the Stanford University School of Medicine. She is also the director of the Stanford Patient Education Research Center. She is known for her work on chronic disease and patient education, has published several books and peer-reviewed journal articles in those fields, and developed a peer-led self-management course for patients with chronic diseases. Lorig is herself a chronic disease patient, having been diagnosed with Gaucher's disease at the age of three.

Lorig received her B.S. in nursing at Boston University in 1964, her M.S. in nursing at the University of California, San Francisco in 1968, and her Dr.P.H. in health education at the University of California, Berkeley in 1980. Lorig joined Stanford Medical School in 1978 as a research associate, becoming a professor in 1995. She has been a professor at the UCSF School of Nursing since 1985, and was a lecturer at San Jose State University, Department of Health Sciences, from 1980 to 1989.

Kaiser Permanente adopted the Chronic Disease Self Management (CDSM) course in 1997. In 2001, the CDSM and Lorig's arthritis specific self-management courses were included in the United Kingdom National Health Service's Expert Patient Programme, on a trial basis. The program, and Lorig's courses, were adopted into the mainstream of the NHS beginning in 2004. In 2007, Dr. Lorig worked with the VA Desert Pacific Health Care Network/Department of Veteran Affairs to develop a pilot online self-management model for family caregivers based on her previous work.

Lorig is a member of the Network of Innovators of the World Health Organization's Observatory on Health Care for Chronic Conditions. She received the Molly Mettler Award from the National Council on Aging's Health Promotion Institute in 2003.

== Post-degree honors and awards ==
- Virginia P. Engalitcheff Award for Impact on Quality of Life, National Arthritis Foundation, 1996
- Mayhew Derryberry Award for Excellence in Combining Theory with Practice, Health Education Section, American Public Health Association, 1993
- Hochbaum Lecturer, University of North Carolina, School of Public Health, 1993
- Award for Excellence in Health Education, National Health Management Foundation, 1992
- Nancy Palchick Publication Award, Arthritis Health Professionals Association, 1992
- Program Excellence Award, Society for Public Health Education, 1989
- Recognition for Creative Health Education Programming, Northern California Society for Public Health Education, 1983
- Award in Recognition of Outstanding Scholarly Contribution in Rheumatology in 1980–81, Arthritis Health Professionals Association, 1982

== Selected publications ==
- Lorig K, Lubeck D, Kraines RG, Seleznick M, Holman HR. Outcomes of self-help education for patients with arthritis. Arthritis Rheum. 1985 Jun;28(6):680-5. PMID 4004977
- O'Leary A, Shoor S, Lorig K, Holman HR. A cognitive-behavioral treatment for rheumatoid arthritis. Health Psychol. 1988;7(6):527-44. PMID 3063517
- Lorig K, Chastain RL, Ung E, Shoor S, Holman HR. Development and evaluation of a scale to measure perceived self-efficacy in people with arthritis. Arthritis Rheum. 1989 Jan;32(1):37-44. PMID 2912463
- Lorig KR, Mazonson PD, Holman HR. Evidence suggesting that health education for self-management in patients with chronic arthritis has sustained health benefits while reducing health care costs. Arthritis Rheum. 1993 Apr;36(4):439-46. PMID 8457219
- Lorig K, Holman H. Arthritis self-management studies: a twelve-year review. Health Educ Q. 1993 Spring;20(1):17-28. PMID 8444622
- Lorig K. Outcome measures for health education and other health care interventions. Thousand Oaks, CA: Sage Publications, 1996. ISBN 0-7619-0066-7
- Lorig KR, Sobel DS, Stewart AL, Brown BW Jr, Bandura A, Ritter P, Gonzalez VM, Laurent DD, Holman HR. Evidence suggesting that a chronic disease self-management program can improve health status while reducing hospitalization: a randomized trial. Med Care. 1999 Jan;37(1):5-14. PMID 10413387
- Holman H, Lorig K. Patients as partners in managing chronic disease. Partnership is a prerequisite for effective and efficient health care. BMJ. 2000 Feb 26;320(7234):526-7. PMID 10688539
- Lorig KR, Ritter P, Stewart AL, Sobel DS, Brown BW Jr, Bandura A, Gonzalez VM, Laurent DD, Holman HR. Chronic disease self-management program: 2-year health status and health care utilization outcomes. Med Care. 2001 Nov;39(11):1217-23. PMID 11606875
- Lorig K. Patient education: a practical approach. 3rd ed. Thousand Oaks, CA: Sage Publications, 2001. ISBN 0-7619-2289-X
- Bodenheimer T, Lorig K, Holman H, Grumbach K. Patient self-management of chronic disease in primary care. JAMA. 2002 Nov 20;288(19):2469-75. PMID 12435261
- Lorig KR, Holman H. Self-management education: history, definition, outcomes, and mechanisms. Ann Behav Med. 2003 Aug;26(1):1-7. PMID 12867348
- Lorig KR, Ritter PL, Laurent DD, Plant K. Internet-based chronic disease self-management: a randomized trial. Med Care. 2006 Nov;44(11):964-71. PMID 17063127
- Lorig K, Fries JF. The arthritis helpbook: a tested self-management program for coping with arthritis and fibromyalgia. 6th ed. Cambridge, MA: Da Capo Lifelong, 2006. ISBN 0-7382-1038-2
- Lorig K. Living a healthy life with chronic conditions: self-management of heart disease, arthritis, diabetes, asthma, bronchitis, emphysema & others. 3rd ed. Boulder, CO: Bull, 2006. ISBN 1-933503-01-7
- Lorig KR, Ritter PL, Laurent DD, Plant K. The internet-based arthritis self-management program: a one-year randomized trial for patients with arthritis or fibromyalgia. Arthritis Rheum. 2008 Jul 15;59(7):1009-17. PMID 18576310
- Lorig K, Ritter PL, Villa FJ, Armas J. Community-based peer-led diabetes self-management: a randomized trial. Diabetes Educ. 2009 Jul-Aug;35(4):641-51. PMID 19407333
- Lorig K, Ritter PL, Laurent DD, Plant K, Green M, Jernigan VB, Case S. Online diabetes self-management program: a randomized study. Diabetes Care. 2010 Jun;33(6):1275-81. PMID 20299481
