= PopHealth =

Population health reporting software

popHealth
- Original author: MITRE Corporation
- Developer: OSEHRA popHealth Community
- Stable release: 6.22 / December 6, 2022
- Written in: Ruby and JavaScript
- Operating system: Cross-platform
- License: Apache License 2
- Website: www.osehra.org/popHealth/
- Repository: github.com/OSEHRA/popHealth

popHealth is an open-source reference implementation software tool that automates population health reporting.

popHealth integrates with a healthcare provider's electronic health record (EHR) system to produce clinical quality measures (CQM) on the provider's patient population.

== Overview ==
popHealth is an open source software tool that generates population health reporting for clinical quality measures for the Centers for Medicare & Medicaid Services Meaningful Use program. popHealth integrates with a provider's electronic health record (EHR) to produce summary quality measures on the provider's patient population. popHealth enables a provider to view their quality measures and drill down to the patient data behind them. popHealth allows providers to easily identify outliers for a quality measure. popHealth leverages HL7's Clinical Document Architecture as a standard to receive data from EHRs and other clinical data repositories. Vendors and healthcare providers using clinical repositories for source data may integrate with popHealth, or leverage the quality measure engine that drives the measure calculation.

popHealth allows healthcare providers to better understand their patient population and gives them tools to improve the health of their patients by performing their own population care analysis. popHealth provides a mechanism for sending data on summary quality measures from individual providers to public health organizations. popHealth was designed to operate within a provider's infrastructure and use encryption to address patient privacy and security; supports pre-defined Meaningful Use quality measure reports, and supports the ability to export the PQRI XML as a reporting artifact for the transmission of summary data.

== Background ==
The popHealth project was initially funded by the Office of the National Coordinator (ONC), under the United States Department of Health and Human Services (HHS) and developed by the MITRE Corporation. In September 2014, popHealth was transitioned to the OSEHRA Open Source Community for maintenance and further development.

popHealth demonstrates how a provider can use the system to submit quality measures or public health data as part of their existing workflow.

popHealth empowers physicians to better understand their patient population and gives them tools to improve the health of their patients by performing their population care analysis. The software also provides a streamlined mechanism for sending data on summary quality measures from individual providers to public health organizations.

As part of the 2012 Health 2.0 Developer Challenge, a total of US$100,000 in awards were offered for the top three projects that utilized the popHealth framework.

== Technical details ==
popHealth is licensed under an Apache 2.0 open-source license. All the popHealth software is freely available for anyone to download, use, modify and/or redistribute. popHealth uses the Ruby on Rails framework, the open source MongoDB database, and Web 2.0 JavaScript libraries. The popHealth user interface is web-based.
