= Dorothea Orem =

American nursing academic

Dorothea Elizabeth Orem (June 15, 1914 – June 22, 2007), born in Baltimore, Maryland, was a nursing theorist and creator of the self-care deficit nursing theory, also known as the Orem model of nursing.

Dorothea Orem

== Education ==
Orem received a nursing diploma from Providence Hospital School of Nursing in Washington, D.C. She also attended Catholic University of America, earning a Bachelor of Science in Nursing Education in 1939 and a Master of Science in Nursing Education in 1945.

Orem has been awarded honorary doctoral degrees from Georgetown University, Incarnate Word College and Illinois Wesleyan University.

== Self-care deficit nursing theory ==
Orem's nursing theory states self-care as a human need, and nurses design interventions to provide or manage self-care actions for persons to recover or maintain health.

== Nursing diagnosis ==
Orem was a member of the group of nurse theorists who presented Patterns of Unitary Man (Humans), the initial framework for nursing diagnosis, to the North American Nursing Diagnosis Association in 1982.

== Awards ==
- 1980: Alumni Achievement Award for Nursing Theory, Catholic University of America

== Death ==
At the age of 92, Orem died on June 22, 2007, in Savannah, Georgia, where she had spent the last 25 years of her life as a consultant and author.
