= Observations of daily living =

Cues people notice about their health

Observations of daily living (ODLs) are cues that people attend to in the course of their everyday life, that inform them about their health.

ODLs are different from signs, symptoms, and clinical indicators in that they are defined by the patient, and are not necessarily directly mapped to biomedical models of disease and illness. Examples of ODLs include observations about sleep patterns, exercise behavior and activity trackers, nutritional intake, attitudes and moods, alertness at work or in class, and environmental features such as clutter in the living or working space. Not all patient-generated data constitute ODLs. For example, a patient with diabetes may record their blood glucose levels every day at home, generating data to share with their clinician. That kind of patient-generated data is crucial to inform clinical decision making, but does not constitute ODLs. ODLs are typically defined by patients and their families because they are meaningful to them, and help them self-manage their health and make decisions about it. ODLs may very well complement biomedical indicators and inform medical decision making by providing a more complete and holistic view of the patient as a whole person, provided they are properly integrated in clinical workflows and supported by health information technologies.

== See also ==
- Chronic care management
- Personal health record
- Self care
- Telehealth
