= Caremark =

Care provider in the United Kingdom

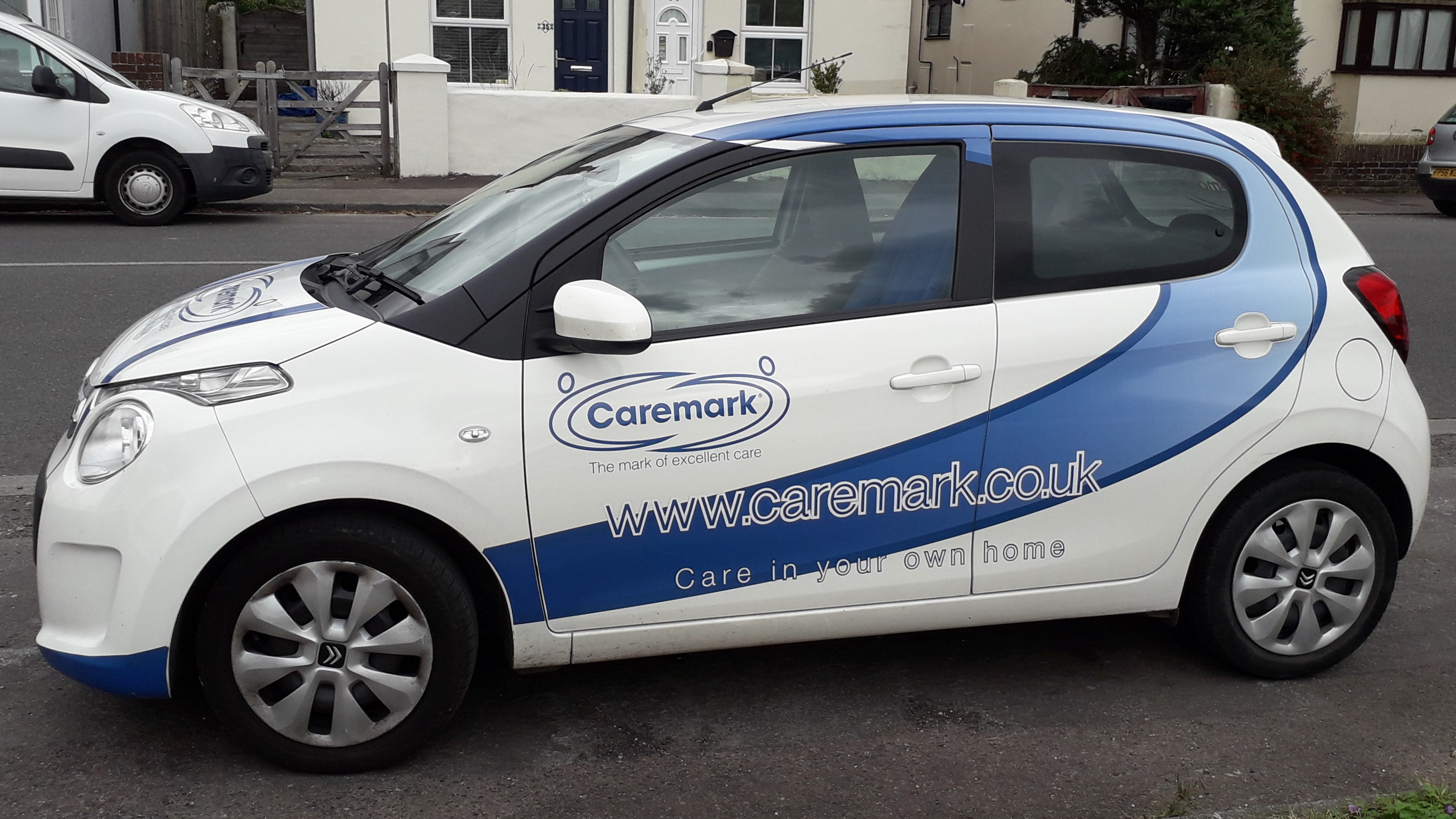
- Caremark branded car used by its employees, taken in 2020
- Company type: Private company
- Industry: Home care
- Founded: 1987; 38 years ago
- Founder: Kevin Lewis
- Headquarters: Worthing, West Sussex, United Kingdom
- Area served: United Kingdom, Ireland and Malta
- Key people: David Glover (CEO)
- Services: In home care
- Number of employees: 7,000 (2025)
- Website: www.caremark.co.uk

Caremark is a British home care services company that operates a network of franchises, specialising in both private-pay and state-funded home care. It was founded by Kevin Lewis, Chief Executive, in 2005 and is based in Worthing.

== History ==
Lewis established a care home in Brighton in 1987. He saw a new opportunity after the British government passed the National Health Service and Community Care Act 1990, to provide care to people in their own homes with an independent company which could be publicly financed by local authorities.

In 2019, Noorina Boodhooa, who owns the franchise in the London Borough of Barnet, and is also senior clinical site manager at the Royal London Hospital met with Boris Johnson to discuss long-term funding solutions and improving hospital-to-home transfers.

In 2020 the business had 128 offices and employed about 6,000 people. Most of the offices are in the UK, with 12 in Ireland, one in Malta and one in India. The Indian office, in Cochin provides free care in a home for 180 people who have been 'abandoned'.

In April 2020 the business was looking to recruit 3000 extra staff in the UK because of demand caused by the COVID-19 pandemic in the United Kingdom. One of the staff from Guildford and Woking was gifted a free tank of petrol and a round of applause from random bystanders at a petrol station. It is also actively recruiting in Ireland.

In 2022 it had more than 7,000 remote caregivers in 115 franchise offices.

== Services ==
Services can include companionship, live-in care where care assistants live in the customer's home, overnight care, and respite care.

In 2021, Caremark Gloucestershire started trials of 'Genie', a voice-activated robot which provides free video calling, welfare video monitoring with alerts, entertainment and access to online shopping and remote medical support for older people. It enables their customers to speak to and see their friends and family.

== Criticism and recognition ==
The Bradford franchise, which was providing care for 159 people, was rated inadequate by the Care Quality Commission in 2019 and placed in special measures after a high number of safeguarding alerts. The Plymouth franchise got an 'Outstanding' rating from the CQC in April 2019.

Two staff from the Huddersfield franchise were nominated for the Great British Care Awards in 2019.

== See also ==
- Private healthcare in the United Kingdom
