= Expert Patient Programme =

Medical support programme

The Expert Patient Programme is a peer-led self care support programme for people living with any long term condition, their carer and families. Originally based on a six-week course developed by Dr. Kate Lorig at Stanford University. It has been expanded to encompass a whole range of programmes. In Spain, the term "Paciente Experto" was introduced by Dr Manuel Serrano-Gil.

Some of the courses are delivered by lay people, some are delivered by a mix of health specialists and lay people. The courses are attended by between 8 and 12 people and last between 6 and 8 weeks depending on the needs of the groups. Research has shown that people who attend courses have improved self-confidence and are more able to deal with impact of long-term illness on their lives.

== See also ==
- Disease management (health)
