= Chronic Fatigue Syndrome Advisory Committee =

Health organization in the United States

- Abbreviation: CFSAC
- Purpose: study of chronic fatigue syndrome
- Location: Washington D.C.

The Chronic Fatigue Syndrome Advisory Committee (CFSAC) was formed in response to the use of funds by the United States Centers for Disease Control and Prevention in the study of chronic fatigue syndrome (CFS). The CFSAC was charted under the Public Health Service Act of the US and funded by the United States Department of Health and Human Services (HHS). The CFSAC advises the Secretary of Health and Human Services on issues related to its mandate, including issues related to access and care for individuals with CFS, research, public health, clinical care and education regarding CFS. In November, 2008, support for CFSAC activities was changed to the Office on Women's Health, a division of the Office of Public Health and Science. It held it first meeting in 2003.

== Recommendations ==
In 2010 the committee advised HHS that the name chronic fatigue syndrome (CFS) should be changed to CFS-ME because the name wasn't being taken seriously. ME stands for myalgic encephalomyelitis or myalgic encephalopathy, according to the panel. One member stated that a more serious-sounding name might encourage more research into the illness. The CFSAC panel also recommended that national CFS-ME network of treatment centers be created by HHS, "in order to expand access to care, to develop educational initiatives, and to allow researchers to share data."

== See also ==
- Chronic fatigue syndrome
