= Girl math =

Internet meme

The phrase "girl math" is an internet meme, used to describe rationalizations by young women to justify or make sense of individual purchases or spending habits. It originated from the social media platform TikTok, later transferring over to Instagram and X (formerly Twitter).

== History ==
The phrase originated from the radio show Fletch, Vaughan & Hailey, a light-hearted New Zealand podcast where the hosts, Carl Fletcher, Vaughan Smith and Hayley Sproull, chat about everyday life, pop culture, and listener questions. In a July 30, 2023 segment, the hosts jokingly used "girl math" to justify recent purchases, prompting callers to contribute their own examples of humorous financial rationalization. Although this usage predates the viral TikTok trend, it did not receive widespread attention until the term resurfaced on social media.

The phrase became especially popular once it reached TikTok, where it went viral. User @samjamessssss posted a video on August 2, 2023 encouraging the transition from "girl dinner", another popular TikTok trend amongst women, to girl math. The video accumulated 3.7 million views and 630.2 thousand likes, demonstrating how the video stimulated the phrase's rise in popularity, allowing it to reach wider audiences than it did prior in the New Zealand podcast. Following, more users and influencers, on TikTok and other social media platforms, began using the phrase in their content, causing the phrase to become a widespread trend.

== Criticism ==
The trend has drawn criticism for its potential to reinforce stereotypes about women's reasoning and mathematical abilities. These criticisms have discussed how the phrase can both reflect and shape societal perceptions of gender, evaluating how it draws on existing social narratives about femininity, often using humor to comment on everyday behaviors. For this reason, the trend has been said to contribute to the circulation of long-held societal gender stereotypes, particularly those suggesting that women's reasoning is emotional, illogical, or inconsistent.

These criticisms argue the trend draws on long-standing prejudices that differentiate men's and women's behaviors, including assumptions about women's decision-making skills. Gendered messages—particularly those implying that girls are less capable in numbers—can reinforce internalized beliefs about female mathematical ability. Labelling illogical calculations used to justify spending habits as girl math, the trend has been said to trivialize women's mathematical abilities, thus perpetuating the stereotype that women are inherently less skilled in logical reasoning. Exposure to such stereotypes can shape girls' self-perception and performance in quantitative tasks, suggesting that trends like girl math may interact with wider societal patterns of gendered expectations.

Beyond concerns related to gender stereotypes, critiques have also highlighted potential financial consequences of applying girl math rationalizations to everyday purchases. Financial experts that have researched related economic phenomena, where consumers justifying potentially irresponsible spending, assert that rationalizing purchases in this way can accumulate into significant costs over time and interfere with long-term saving plans, potentially resulting in psychological distress as a result of financial uncertainty.

== Behavioral economics ==
The girl math trend incorporates several cognitive biases that are studied in behavioral economics, a field of economic analysis that applies psychological insights into human behavior to explain economic decision-making.

Digital payment methods and payment formats with low transparency — the decreased visibility of money leaving an individual's possession — are associated with increased overspending compared to cash. This perception can be explained by applying the psychological concept of "pain of payment," which refers to the greater discomfort experience when parting with tangible cash, as opposed to with a card or other electronic methods. In the context of girl math, this reduced pain lowers a psychological barrier, which may cause gift cards, digital payments like Apple Pay, or other cashless methods to feel like "free money," making it easier to justify purchases.

"Cost-per-use," also referred to as "cost-per-wear" when specifically discussing clothing, is a rationalization method frequently mentioned in girl math. It evaluates high upfront costs by dividing the price by the expected number of times it will be used, emphasizing an item's long-term value. For example, if a sweater costs $100, a consumer may view the purchase as reasonable by considering how often they expect to wear it, effectively lowering the assessed cost-per-use. This approach relies on the framing effect, enabling individuals to justify big-ticket or luxury items by altering their perception of the purchase, viewing it as cost‑efficient over time rather than focusing on expensive price tags. When consumers focus on utility and long‑term benefit rather than just price, they are often more willing to accept higher initial costs, especially for items viewed as utilitarian or durable.

The framing effect can also influence how individuals perceive sales, discounts, or special offers. Presentations of the same discount — such as a percentage-based versus a dollar-based reduction — can be perceived very differently by consumers, affecting their sense of value. When considering girl math, this means individuals are more likely to view purchases as advantageous or justified when the deal is framed appealingly, reinforcing spending behavior through positive presentation rather than objective cost.

Additionally, expensive items presented as part of a limited-time deal may be more appealing than items with cheaper regular prices. For example, a $100 item with a temporary 20% off deal is typically more appealing than an $80 item with no sale, despite their identical costs. This altered perception is a result of both mental framing and the scarcity effect, where limited availability or time-sensitive offers create a sense of urgency, making consumers feel that they must act quickly to secure the item. This can lead to impulse purchases, as consumers use multiple cognitive biases, disguised as girl math justifications, to rationalize the financial decision and perceive the spending as advantageous.

Mental accounting helps provide a framework for girl math rationalizations, explaining how individuals organize and evaluate their financial decisions. The theory considers consumer behavior and how people mentally separate money into different "buckets" or categories — such as one for rent, one for entertainment, or one for shopping — and treat funds within each bucket differently. This affects how gains, losses, and expenditures are perceived, as money is evaluated differently depending on the mental category to which it is assigned. Funds that are unexpected or perceived as extra, like cashback, refunds, salary bonuses, or windfalls, are often treated as more flexible since they don't already belong to an established mental bucket. In practice, mental accounting aids the potentially irrational purchases resulting from girl math, deeming money outside of already-existing financial categories as "free", and therefore easier to spend without guilt.
