= Self-care =

Taking care of one's own health

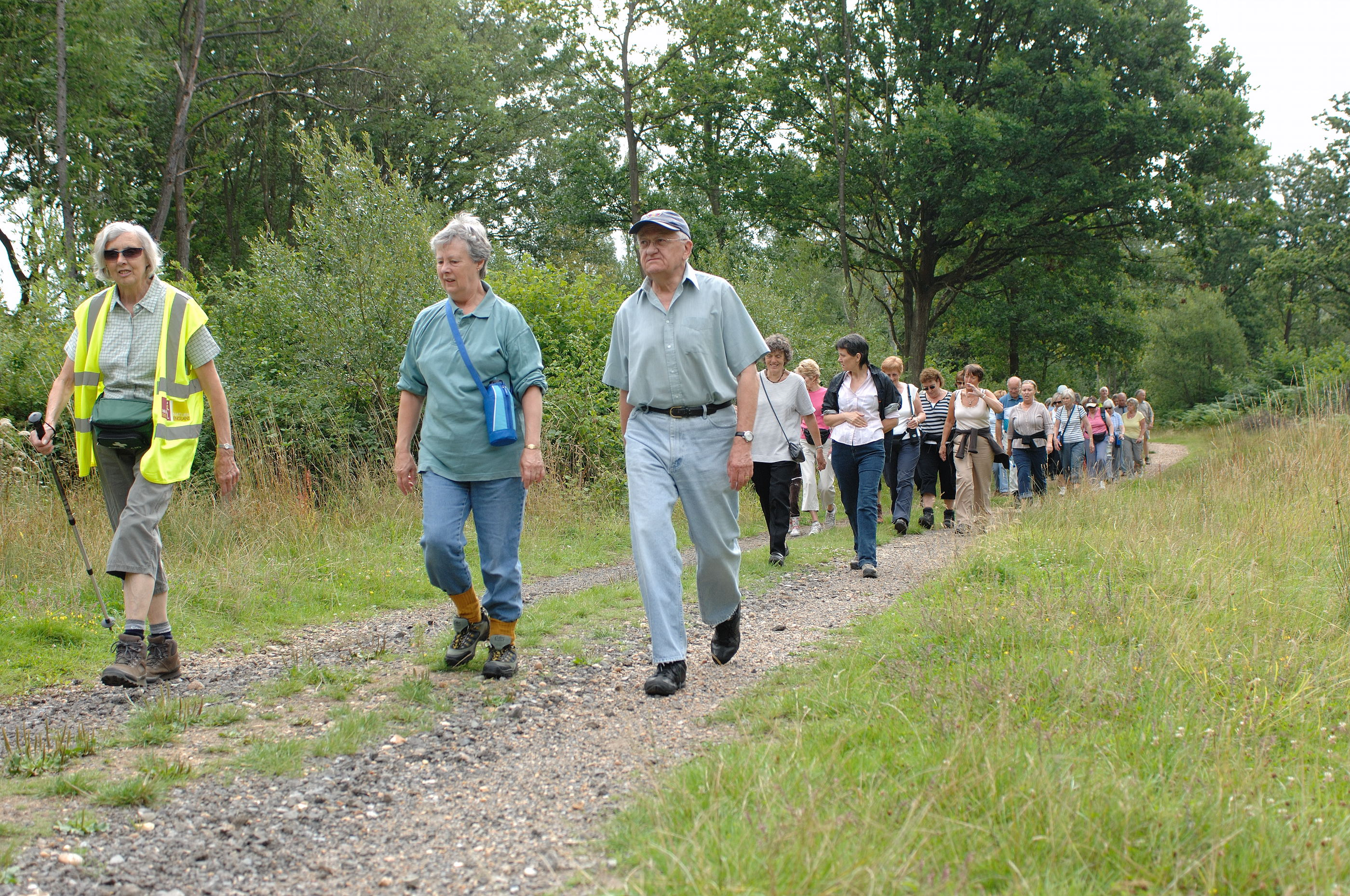
- Walking is beneficial for the maintenance of good health.
- MeSH: D012648

Self-care is the process of establishing behaviors to ensure holistic well-being of oneself, to promote health, and actively manage illness when it occurs. Individuals engage in some form of self-care daily with food choices, exercise, sleep, and hygiene. Self-care is not only a solo activity, as the community—a group that supports the person performing self-care—overall plays a role in access to, implementation of, and success of self-care activities.

Routine self-care is important when someone is not experiencing any symptoms of illness, but self-care becomes essential when illness occurs. General benefits of routine self-care include prevention of illness, improved mental health, and comparatively better quality of life. Self-care practices vary from individual to individual. Self-care is seen as a partial solution to the global rise in health care costs that is placed on governments worldwide.

A lack of self-care in terms of personal health, hygiene and living conditions is referred to as self-neglect. Caregivers or personal care assistants may be needed. There is a growing body of knowledge related to these home care workers.

Self-care and self-management, as described by Lorig and Holman, are closely related concepts. In their spearheading paper, they defined three self-management tasks: medical management, role management, and emotional management; and six self-management skills: problem solving, decision making, resource utilization, the formation of a patient–provider partnership, action planning, and self-tailoring.

== History ==
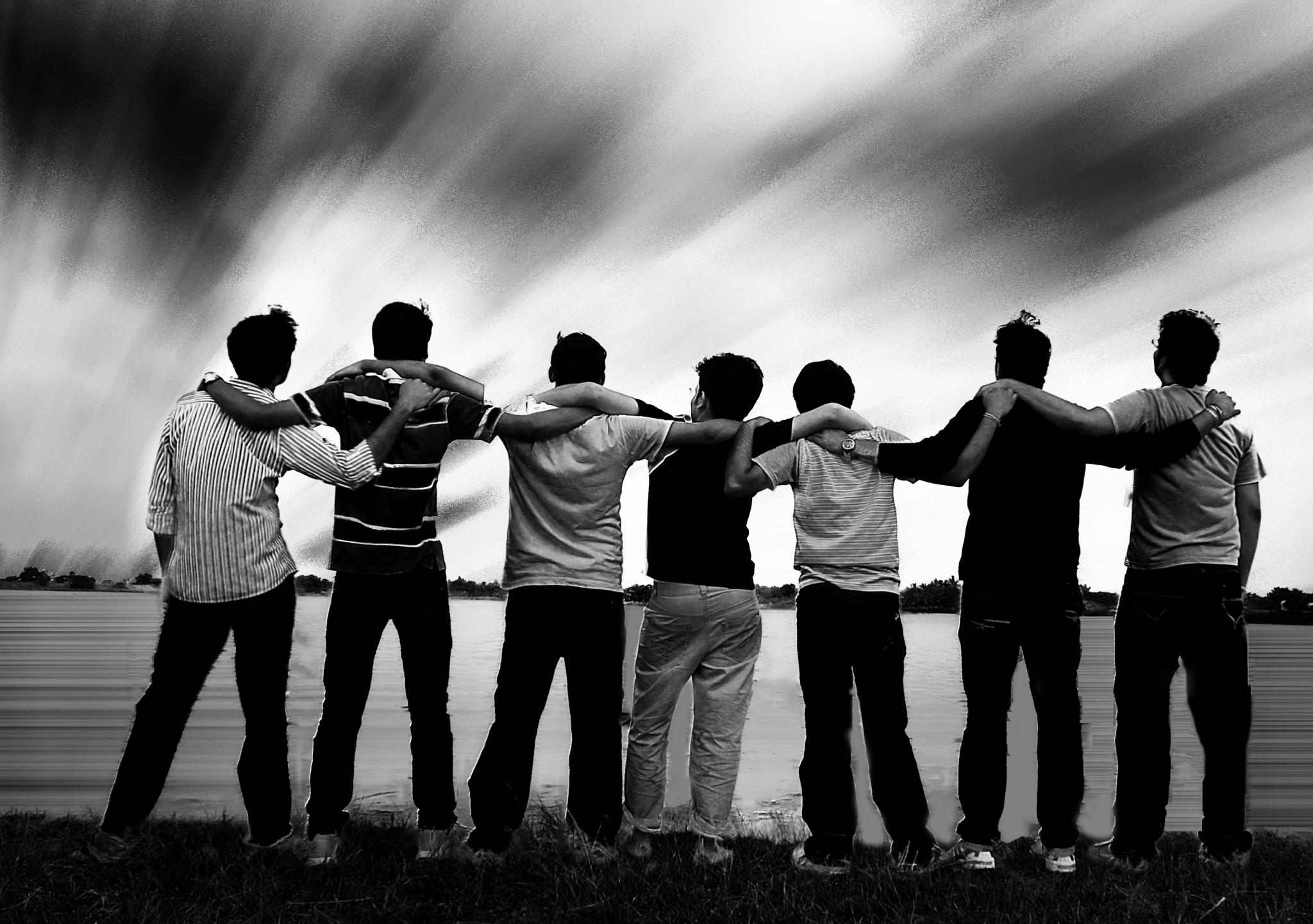
Spending time with friends is a form of self-care

While the concept of self care has received increased attention since 2016, it has ancient origins. Some credit Socrates as an exponent of self-care in ancient Greece, and care of oneself and of loved ones has been shown to exist since human beings appeared on earth.

Use of the term "self-care" in English dates from at least 1567; the word's connection with health appears from 1861.

The civil-rights activist and poet Audre Lorde (1934-1992) connected self-care with the Black feminist movement. Self-care was used to preserve black feminists' identities, energize their activism, and preserve their minds during the civil-rights movement.

Self-care remains a primary form of personal and community healthcare worldwide; self-care practices vary greatly around the world.

== Self-care and illness ==
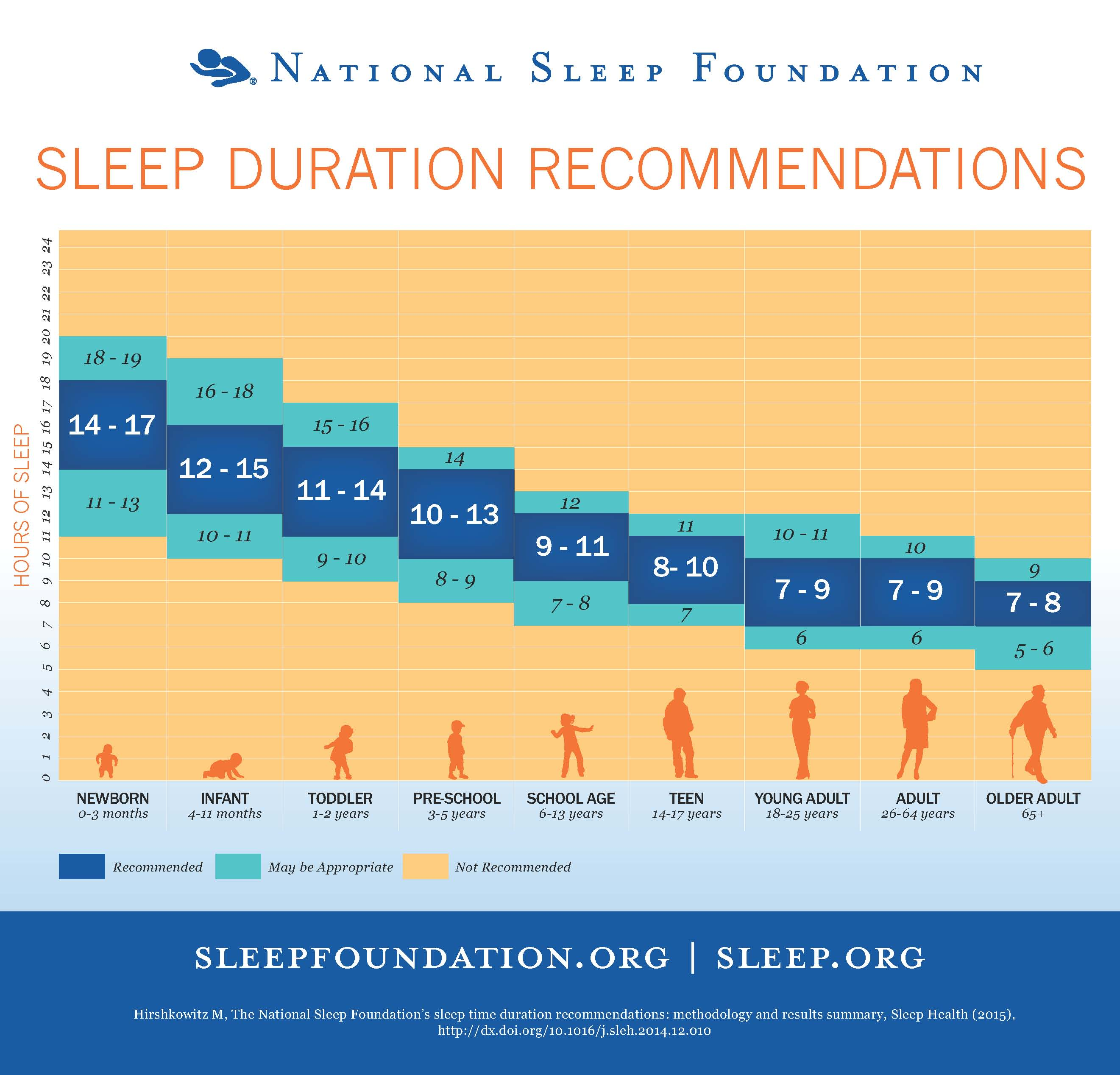
Getting an appropriate amount of sleep each night is a form of self-care.

Chronic illness (a health condition that is persistent and long lasting, often impacts one's whole life, e.g., heart failure, diabetes, high blood pressure) requires behaviors that control the illness, decrease symptoms, and improve survival such as medication adherence and symptom monitoring. An acute illness like an infection (e.g., COVID) requires the same types of self-care behaviors required of people with a chronic illness, but the medication adherence and symptom monitoring behaviors associated with an acute illness are typically short lived. Routine health maintenance self-care behaviors that individuals engage in (e.g., adequate sleep) are still required of those dealing with acute or chronic illness.

For the majority of people with a chronic illness, time spent having that illness managed by a health professional is vastly outweighed by time spent in self-care. It has been estimated that most people with a chronic illness spend only about 0.001% or 10 hours per year of their time with a healthcare provider. In people with chronic illness, self-care is associated with fewer symptoms, fewer hospitalizations, better quality of life, and longer survival compared to individuals in whom self-care is poor. Self-care can be physically and mentally difficult for those with chronic illness, as their illness is persistent and treated in a vastly different manner from an acute illness.

== Factors influencing self-care ==
There are numerous factors that affect self-care. These factors can be grouped as personal factors (e.g., person, problem, and environment), external factors, and processes.

Personal factors:

- Lack of motivation: when one doesn't have enough energy. This can be caused by stress, anxiety, or other mental health illnesses.
- Cultural beliefs: this includes traditional gender roles, family relationships, collectivism. This can also affect self care behaviors.
- Self-efficacy or confidence: one's confidence can positively or negatively affect their mental state.
- Functional and cognitive abilities: by not being perfect humans, one tends to focus on their weakness.
- Support from others: such as from family or friends can be crucial to have a healthy and positive mindset to do self-care.
- Access to care: depending on the self-care some require specific resources or objects in order to carry out.

External factors:

- Living situation: can greatly affect an individual's self-care.
- Surrounding environment: must be safe and promote self-care for all residents.
- Proximity of health care facilities: are important to have at a close radius from one's household. As well as office/clinic opening hours and affordability must be taken into consideration.

Processes:

- Experiences
- Knowledge
- Skill
- Values

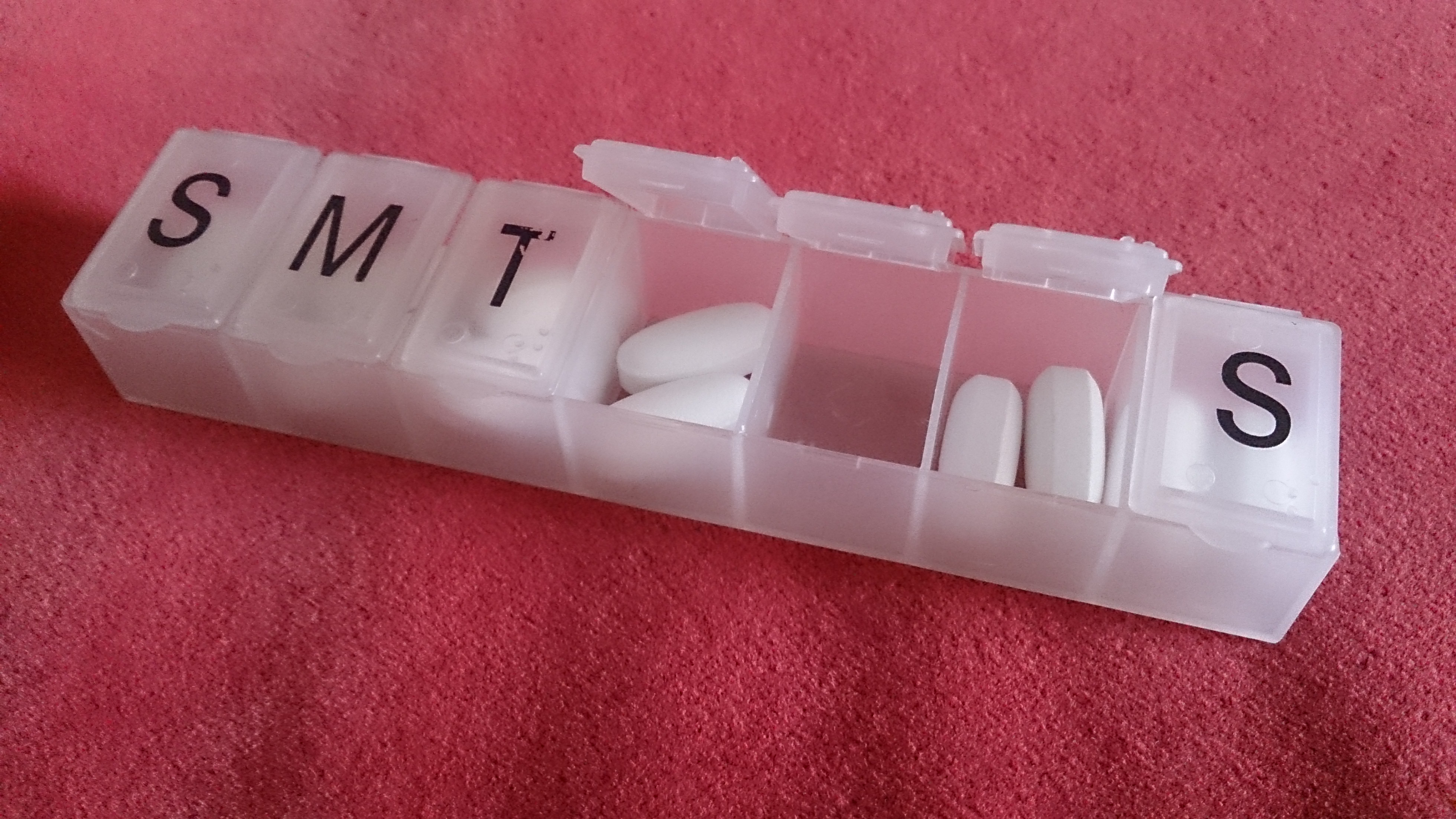
Taking needed medicines is a form of self-care that may be difficult for people with memory problems. A box that organizes the correct pills for each day of the week may help.

Self-care practices are shaped by what are seen as the proper lifestyle choices of local communities. Social determinants of health play an important role in self-care practices. Internal personal factors such as motivation, emotions, and cognitive abilities also influence self-care maintenance behaviors. Motivation is often the driving force behind performing self-care maintenance behaviors. Goal setting is a practice associated with motivated self care. A person with depression is more likely to have a poor dietary intake low in fruits and vegetables, reduced physical activity, and poor medication adherence. An individual with impaired cognitive or functional abilities (e.g., memory impairment) also has a diminished capacity to perform self-care maintenance behaviors such as medication adherence which relies on memory to maintain a schedule.

Self-care is influenced by an individual's attitude and belief in his or her self-efficacy or confidence in performing tasks and overcoming barriers. Cultural beliefs and values may also influence self-care. Cultures that promote a hard-working lifestyle may view self-care in contradictory ways Personal values have been shown to have an effect on self-care in Type 2 Diabetes Mellitus.

Social support systems can influence how an individual performs self-care maintenance. Social support systems include family, friends, and other community or religious support groups. These support systems provide opportunities for self-care discussions and decisions. Shared care can reduce stress on individuals with chronic illness.

There are numerous self-care requisites applicable to all individuals of all ages for the maintenance of health and well-being. The balance between solitude or rest, and activities such as social interactions is a key tenet of self-care practices. The prevention and avoidance of human hazards and participation in social groups are also requisites. The autonomous performance of self-care behaviors is thought to aid elderly patients. Perceived autonomy, self-efficacy and adequate illness representation are additional elements of self-care, which are said to aid people with chronic conditions.

== Measurement of self-care behaviors ==
A variety of self-report instruments have been developed to allow clinicians and researchers to measure the level of self-care in different situations for both patients and their caregivers: These instruments are freely available in numerous languages. Many of these instruments have a caregiver version available to encourage dyadic research.

- Self-Care Heart Failure Index
- Self-Care of Hypertension Inventory
- Self-Care of Diabetes Inventory
- Self-Care of Coronary Heart Disease Inventory
- Self-Care of Chronic Illness Inventory
- Self-care of Chronic Obstructive Pulmonary Disease

== Middle-range theory of self-care of chronic illness ==
According to the middle-range theory of chronic illness, these behaviors are captured in the concepts of self-care maintenance, self-care monitoring, and self-care management. Self-care maintenance refers to those behaviors used to maintain physical and emotional stability. Self-care monitoring is the process of observing oneself for changes in signs and symptoms. Self-care management is the response to signs and symptoms when they occur. The recognition and evaluation of symptoms is a key aspect of self-care.

Below these concepts are discussed both as general concepts and as specific self-care behaviors are (e.g., exercise).

=== Self-care maintenance ===
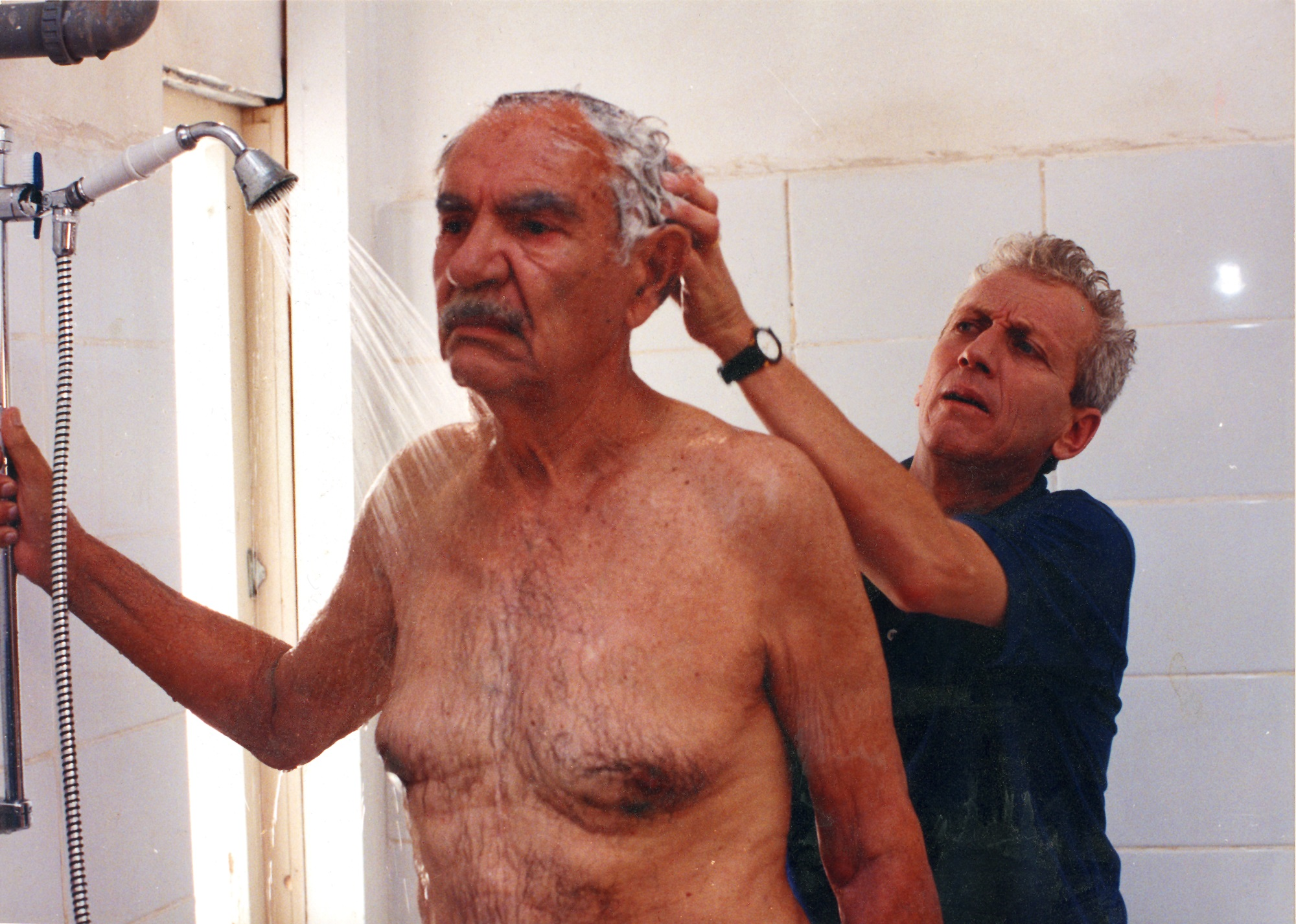
Keeping the body clean is part of self-care. When people are unable to shower or bathe safely alone, they may enlist another person to help them.

Self-care maintenance refers to those behaviors performed to improve well-being, preserve health, or to maintain physical and emotional stability. Self-care maintenance behaviors include illness prevention and maintaining proper hygiene.

Specific illness prevention measures include tobacco avoidance, regular exercise, and a healthy diet. Taking medication as prescribed by a healthcare provider and receiving vaccinations are also important specific self-care behaviors. Vaccinations provide immunity for the body to actively prevent an infectious disease. Tobacco use is the largest preventable cause of death and disease in the US. Overall health and quality of life have been found to improve, and the risk of disease and premature death are reduced due to the decrease in tobacco intake.

The benefits of regular physical activity include weight control; reduced risk of chronic disease; strengthened bones and muscles; improved mental health; improved ability to participate in daily activities; and decreased mortality. The Centre for Disease Control and Prevention (CDC) recommends two hours and thirty minutes of moderate activity each week, including brisk walking, swimming, or bike riding.

Another aspect of self-care maintenance is a healthy diet consisting of a wide variety of fresh fruits and vegetables, lean meats, and other proteins. Processed foods including fats, sugars, and sodium are to be avoided, under the practice of self-care.

Hygiene is another important part of self-care maintenance. Hygienic behaviors include adequate sleep, regular oral care, and hand washing. Getting seven to eight hours of sleep each night can protect physical and mental health. Sleep deficiency increases the risk of heart disease, kidney disease, high blood pressure, diabetes, excess weight, and risk-taking behavior. Tooth brushing and personal hygiene can prevent oral infections.

Senator Kamala Harris talks about her self care during the COVID-19 pandemic in 2020.

Health-related self-care topics include;

- General fitness training and physical exercise
- Healthy diet, meals, diet foods and fasting
- Smoking cessation and avoiding excessive alcohol use
- Personal hygiene
- Life extension
- Pain management
- Stress management
- Self-help and personal development
- Self-care portals and the use of health apps

Objective Measures of Specific Self-Care Maintenance Behaviors:

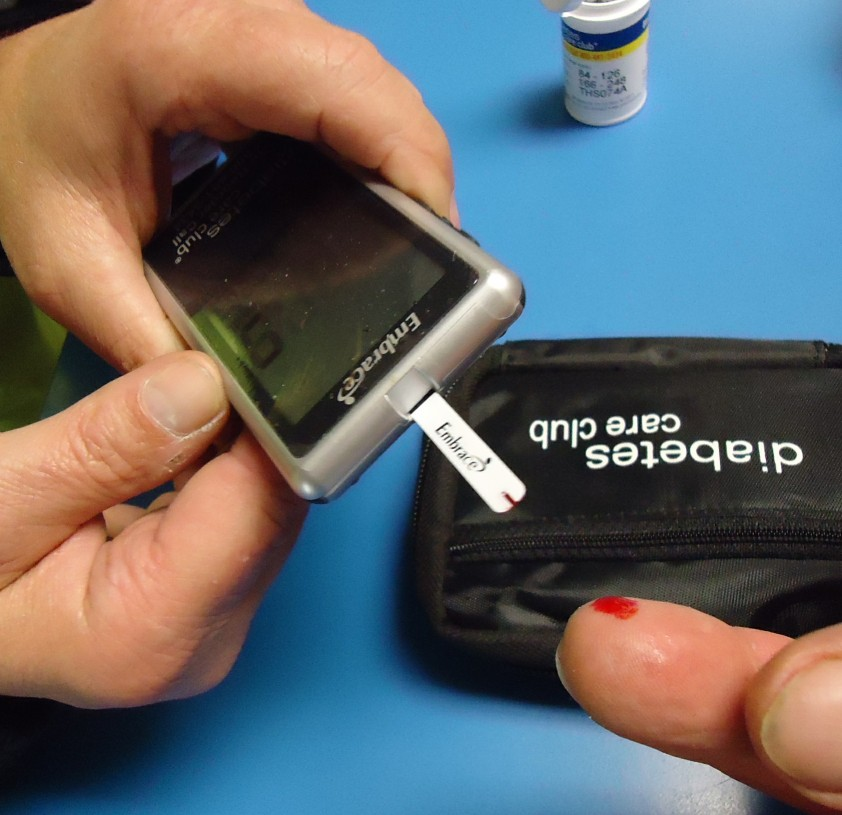
Blood sugar testing for diabetes is a form of self-care.

=== Interventions to improve maintenance behaviors ===
Self-care is considered to be a continuous learning process. Knowledge is essential but not sufficient to improve self-care. Multifaceted interventions that tailor education to the individual are more effective than patient education alone.

- "Teach-back" is used to gauge how much information is retained after patient teaching. Teach-back occurs when patients are asked to repeat information that was given to them. The educator checks for gaps in the patient's understanding, reinforces messages, and creates a collaborative conversation with the patient. It is important for individuals with a chronic illness to comprehend and recall information received about their condition. Teach-back education can both educate patients and assess learning. For example, a provider can initiate teach-back is by asking, "I want to make sure that I explained everything clearly. If you were talking to your neighbor, what would you tell her/him we talked about today". This phrase protects the patient's self-esteem while placing responsibility for understanding on both the provider and patient. One study performed showed that patients with heart failure who received teach-back education had a 12% lower readmission rate compared to patients who did not receive teach-back. Although the teach-back method is effective in the short-term, there is little evidence to support its long-term effect. Long-term knowledge retention is crucial for self-care, so further research is needed on this approach.
- Habits are automatic responses to commonly encountered situations such as handwashing after restroom use. A habit is formed when environmental cues result in a behavior with minimal conscious deliberation.
- Behavioral economics is a subset of the study of economics that examines how cognitive, social, and emotional factors play in role in an individual's economic decisions. Behavioral economics is now influencing the design of healthcare interventions aimed at improving self-care maintenance. Behavioral economics takes into account the complexity and irrationality of human behavior.
- Motivational interviewing is a way to engage critical thinking in relation to self-care needs. Motivational interviewing uses an interviewing style that focuses on the individual's goals in any context. Motivational interviewing is based on three psychological theories: cognitive dissonance, self-perception, and the transtheoretical model of change. Motivational interviewing is intended to enhance intrinsic motivation for change.
- Health coaching is a method of promoting motivation to initiate and maintain behavioral change. The health coach facilitates behavioral change by emphasizing personal goals, life experiences, and values.

== Monitoring ==
Self-care monitoring is the process of surveillance that involves measurement and perception of bodily changes, or "body listening". It can be helpful to understand the concept of bodymind when monitoring self-care. Effective self-care monitoring also requires the ability to label and interpret changes in the body as normal or abnormal. Recognizing bodily signs and symptoms, understanding disease progression, and their respective treatments allow competency in knowing when to seek further medical help.

Self-care monitoring consists of both the perception and measurement of symptoms. Symptom perception is the process of monitoring one's body for signs of changing health. This includes body awareness or body listening, and the recognition of symptoms relevant to health.

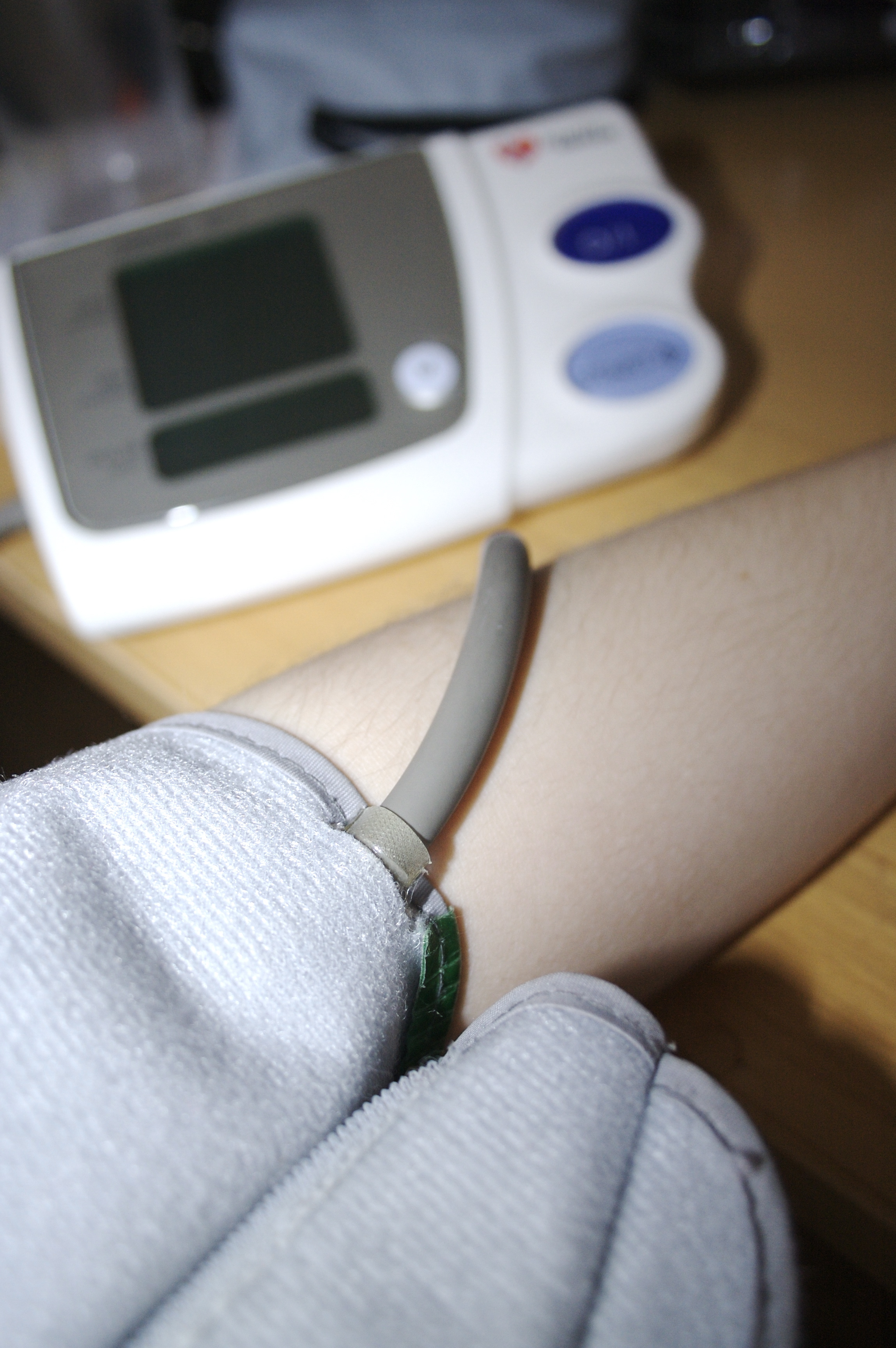
Checking blood pressure at home with an electronic sphygmomanometer. Monitoring chronic medical conditions is a form of self-care.

Changes in health status or body function can be monitored with various tools and technologies. The range and complexity of medical devices used in both hospital and home care settings are increasing. Certain devices are specific to a common need of a disease process such as glucose monitors for tracking blood sugar levels in diabetic patients. Other devices can provide a more general set of information, such as a weight scale, blood pressure cuff, pulse oximeter, etc. Less technological tools include organizers, charts, and diagrams to trend or keep track of progress such as the number of calories, mood, vital sign measurements, etc.

=== Barriers to monitoring ===
The ability to engage in self-care monitoring impacts disease progression. Barriers to monitoring can go unrecognized and interfere with effective self-care. Barriers include knowledge deficits, undesirable self-care regimens, different instructions from multiple providers, and limitations to access related to income or disability. Psychosocial factors such as motivation, anxiety, depression, confidence can also serve as barriers.

- High costs may prevent some individuals from acquiring monitoring equipment to keep track of symptoms.
- Lack of knowledge on the implications of physiological symptoms such as high blood glucose levels may reduce an individual's motivation to practice self-care monitoring.
- Fear of outcomes/fear of using equipment such as needles may deter patients from practicing self-care monitoring due to the resulting anxiety, or avoidant behaviors.
- Lack of family support may affect consistency in monitoring self-care due to the lack of reminders or encouragement.

The presence of co-morbid conditions makes performing self-care monitoring particularly difficult. For example, the shortness of breath from COPD can prevent a diabetic patient from physical exercise. Symptoms of chronic illnesses should be considered when performing self-care maintenance behaviors.

=== Interventions to improve monitoring behaviors ===
Because self-care monitoring is conducted primarily by patients, with input from caregivers, it is necessary to work with patients closely on this topic. Providers should assess the current self-care monitoring regimen and build off this to create an individualized plan of care. Knowledge and education specifically designed for the patient's level of understanding has been said to be central to self-care monitoring. When patients understand the symptoms that correspond with their disease, they can learn to recognize these symptoms early on. Then they can self-manage their disease and prevent complications.

Additional research to improve self-care monitoring is underway in the following fields:

- Mindfulness: Mindfulness and meditation, when incorporated into a one-day education program for diabetic patients, have been shown to improve diabetic control in a 3-month follow-up in comparison to those who received the education without a focus on mindfulness.
- Decision-making: How a patient's decision making capacity can be encouraged/improved with the support of their provider, leading to better self-care monitoring and outcomes.
- Self-efficacy: Self-efficacy has been shown to be more closely linked to a patient's ability to perform self-care than health literacy or knowledge.
- Wearable technology: How self-care monitoring is evolving with technology like wearable activity monitors.

== Management ==
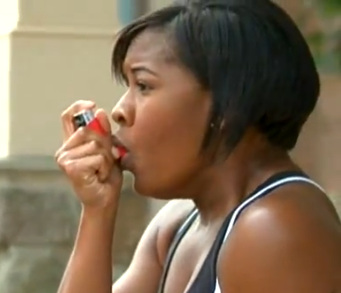
Asthma inhalers contain a medication that treats the symptoms of asthma. Recognizing asthma symptoms and taking asthma medication or other appropriate action is a type of self-management.

Self-care management is defined as the response to signs and symptoms when they occur. Self-care management involves the evaluation of physical and emotional changes and deciding if these changes need to be addressed. Changes may occur because of illness, treatment, or the environment. Once treatment is complete, it should be evaluated to judge whether it would be useful to repeat in the future. Treatments are based on the signs and symptoms experienced. Treatments are usually specific to the illness.

Self-care management includes recognizing symptoms, treating the symptoms, and evaluating the treatment. Self-care management behaviors are symptom- and disease-specific. For example, a patient with asthma may recognize the symptom of shortness of breath. This patient can manage the symptom by using an inhaler and seeing if their breathing improves. A patient with heart failure manages their condition by recognizing symptoms such as swelling and shortness of breath. Self-care management behaviors for heart failure may include taking a water pill, limiting fluid and salt intake, and seeking help from a healthcare provider.

Regular self-care monitoring is needed to identify symptoms early and judge the effectiveness of treatments. Some examples include:

- Inject insulin in response to high blood sugar and then re-check to evaluate if blood glucose lowered
- Use social support and healthy leisure activities to fight feelings of social isolation. This has been shown to be effective for patients with chronic lung disease

=== Barriers to management ===
==== Access to care ====
Access to care is a major barrier affecting self-care management. Treatment of symptoms might require consultation with a healthcare provider. Access to the health-care system is largely influenced by providers. Many people with a chronic illness do not have access to providers within the health-care system for several reasons. Three major barriers to care include: insurance coverage, poor access to services, and being unable to afford costs. Without access to trained health care providers, outcomes are typically worse.

==== Financial constraints ====
Financial barriers impact self-care management. The majority of insurance coverage is provided by employers. Loss of employment is frequently accompanied by loss of health insurance and inability to afford health care. In patients with diabetes and chronic heart disease, financial barriers are associated with poor access to care, poor quality of care, and vascular disease. As a result, these patients have reduced rates of medical assessments, measurements of Hemoglobin A1C (a marker that assesses blood glucose levels over the last 3 months), cholesterol measurements, eye and foot examinations, diabetes education, and aspirin use. Research has found that people in higher social classes are better at self-care management of chronic conditions. In addition, people with lower levels of education often lack resources to effectively engage in self-management behaviors.

==== Age ====
Elderly patients are more likely to rate their symptoms differently and delay seeking care longer when they have symptoms. An elderly person with heart failure will experience the symptom of shortness of breath differently than someone with heart failure who is younger. Providers should be aware of the potential delay in provider-seeking behavior in elderly patients which could worsen their overall condition.

==== Prior experience ====
Prior experience contributes to the development of skills in self-care management. Experience helps the patient develop cues and patterns that they can remember and follow, leading to reasonable goals and actions in repeat situations. A patient who has skills in self-management knows what to do during repeated symptomatic events. This could lead to them recognizing their symptoms earlier, and seeking a provider sooner.

==== Health care literacy ====
Health care literacy is another factor affecting self-care management. Health care literacy is the amount of basic health information people can understand. Health care literacy is the major variable contributing to differences in patient ratings of self-management support. Successful self-care involves understanding the meaning of changes in one's body. Individuals who can identify changes in their bodies are then able to come up with options and decide on a course of action. Health education at the patient's literacy level can increase the patient's ability to problem solve, set goals, and acquire skills in applying practical information. A patient's literacy can also affect their rating of healthcare quality. A poor healthcare experience may cause a patient to avoid returning to that same provider. This creates a delay in acute symptom management. Providers must consider health literacy when designing treatment plans that require self-management skills.

==== Co-morbid conditions ====
A patient with multiple chronic illnesses (multimorbidity) may experience compounding effects of their illnesses. This can include worsening of one condition by the symptoms or treatment of another. People tend to prioritize one of their conditions. This limits the self-care management of their other illnesses. One condition may have more noticeable symptoms than others. Or the patient may be more emotionally connected to one illness, for example, the one they have had for a long time. If providers are unaware of the effect of having multiple illnesses, the patient's overall health may fail to improve or worsen as a result of therapeutic efforts.

=== Interventions to improve management ===
There are many ways for patients and healthcare providers to work together to improve patients and caregivers' self-care management. Stoplight and skill teaching allow patients and providers to work together to develop decision-making strategies.

==== Stoplight ====
Stoplight is an action plan for the daily treatment of a patient's chronic illness created by the healthcare team and the patient. It makes decision making easier by categorizing signs and symptoms and determining the appropriate actions for each set. It separates signs and symptoms into three zones:

- Green is the safe zone, meaning the patient's signs and symptoms are what is typically expected. The patient should continue with their daily self-care tasks, such as taking daily medications and eating a healthy diet.
- Yellow is the caution zone, meaning the patient's signs and symptoms should be monitored as they are abnormal, but they are not yet dangerous. Some actions may need to be taken in this zone to go back to the green zone, for instance taking additional medication. The patient may need to contact their healthcare team for advice.
- Red is the danger zone, meaning the patient's signs and symptoms show that something is dangerously wrong. If in this category the patient needs to take actions to return to the green category, such as taking an emergency medication, as well as contact their healthcare team immediately. They may also need to contact emergency medical assistance.

The stoplight plan helps patients to make decisions about what actions to take for different signs and symptoms and when to contact their healthcare team with a problem. The patient and their provider will customize certain signs and symptoms that fit in each stoplight category.

==== Skills teaching ====
Skills teaching is a learning opportunity between a healthcare provider and a patient where a patient learns a skill in self-care unique to his or her chronic illness. Some of these skills may be applied to the daily management of the symptoms of a chronic illness. Other skills may be applied when there is an exacerbation of a symptom.

A patient newly diagnosed with persistent asthma might learn about taking oral medicine for daily management, control of chronic symptoms, and prevention of an asthma attack. However, there may come a time when the patient might be exposed to an environmental trigger or stress that causes an asthma attack. When unexpected symptoms such as wheezing occur, the skill of taking daily medicines and the medicine that is taken may change. Rather than taking oral medicine daily, an inhaler is needed for quick rescue and relief of symptoms. Knowing to choose the right medication and knowing how to take the medicine with an inhaler is a skill that is learned for the self-care management of asthma.

In skills teaching, the patient and provider need to discuss skills and address any lingering questions. The patient needs to know when and how a skill is to be implemented, and how the skill may need to be changed when the symptom is different from normal. See the summary of tactical and situational skills above. Learning self-care management skills for the first time in the care of a chronic illness is not easy, but with patience, practice, persistence, and experience, personal mastery of self-care skills can be achieved.

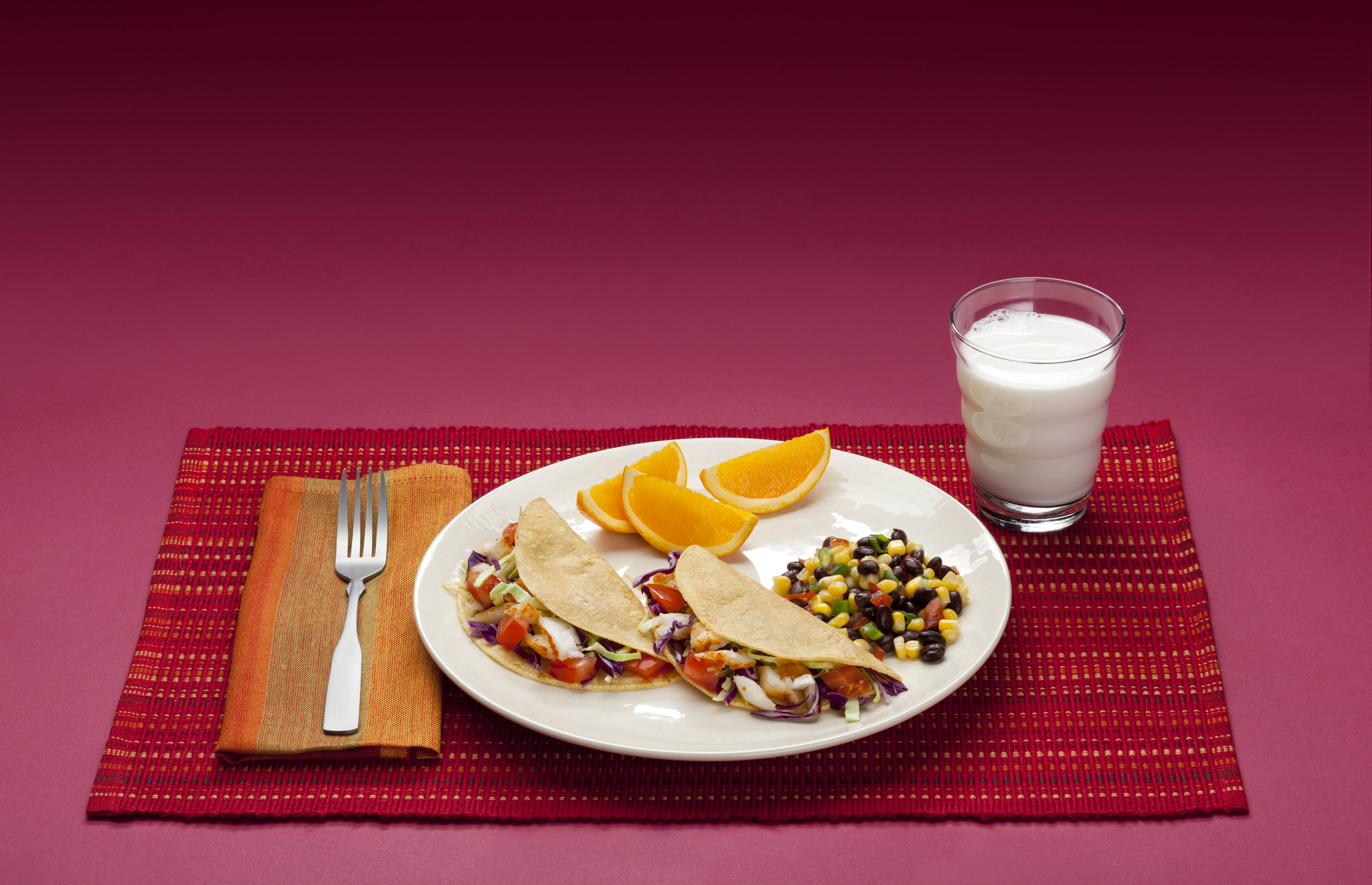
Eating healthy meals, with fruit, vegetables, and protein, is a form of self-care.

Support can include:

- Self-care information on health and human body systems, lifestyle and healthy eating.
- Support to capture, manage, interpret, and report observations of daily living (ODLs), the tracking of trends, and the use of the resulting information as clues for self-care action and decision making.
- Information prescriptions providing personalized information and instructions to enable an individual to self-care and take control of their health
- Self-care and self-monitoring devices and assistive technology.
- Medication therapy management
- Self-care skills and life skills training programs and courses for people.
- Advice from licensed counselors, clinical social workers, psychotherapists, pharmacists, physiotherapists and complementary therapists.
- Self-care support networks which can be face to face or virtual, and made up of peers or people who want to provide support to others or receive support and information from others (including a self-care primer for provider/consumer convergence).
- Knowledge of easily accessible resources such as local parks.

== Self-care for caregivers ==
Long-term caregivers, such as women whose husbands have dementia, frequently neglect to care for themselves. In trying to keep their loved ones safe and get through each day, they may not make time to take a shower, spend a few minutes alone in another room, or attend their own medical appointments.

== Self-care in philosophy ==
=== Black feminist philosophy ===
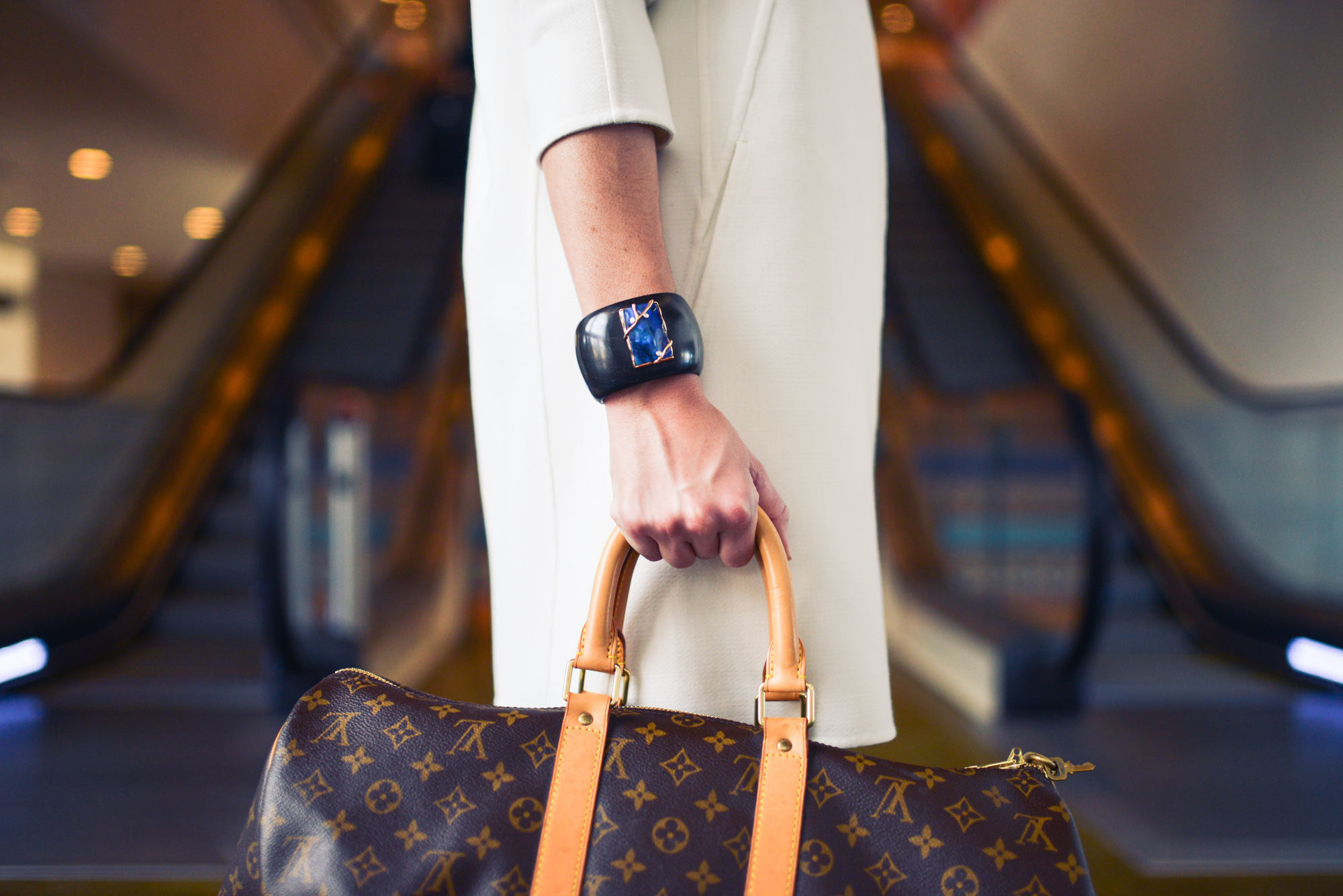
Costly forms of self-indulgence, such as buying luxury goods or going to a day spa, get misrepresented in advertisements and on social media as a form of self-care. These ads tend to elevate beauty standards and trends popular among wealthy white women.

The notion of self-care as a revolutionary act in the context of social trauma was developed as a social justice practice in Black feminist thought in the US. Notably, civil rights activist and poet Audre Lorde wrote that in the context of multiple oppressions as a black woman, "caring for myself is not self-indulgence, it is self-preservation, and that is an act of political warfare." Lorde's philosophy states that as an oppressed community member, the preservation of her identity through acts that energize and sustain her is a form of activism and resistance. This self-care focuses on any acts which are healing and beneficial to one's survival and thereby enable resistance.

This initial interpretation of self-care differs from the popularized version seen today. With the rise in social media and capitalist marketing, a more whitewashed and commercialized interpretation has shifted what is normally considered self-care. Differing from Lorde's definition, some self-care interpretations center on the indulgence of self in accordance with white beauty standards and trends. Examples of this can be the purchasing of feminine beauty goods or sharing of activities or dietary fads. This can result in overspending, especially on trendy non-necessities, sometimes rationalized with references to internet memes like girl math or dupe culture. In addition to this difference, modern day self-care as advertised on social media ignores the communal aspect of care which Lorde thought to be essential. With the rise of the term in the medical usages, for instance, to combat anxiety, as well as the commercialization of products with linkages with self-care, the association of the term with black feminism has fallen away in clinical and popular usage. However, in feminist and queer theory, the link to Lorde and other scholars is retained.

=== Western philosophy ===
In one interpretation, French philosopher Michel Foucault understood the art of living (French art de vivre, Latin ars vivendi) and the care of self (French le souci de soi) to be central to philosophy. The third volume of his three-volume study The History of Sexuality, published in 1976, is dedicated to this notion. For Foucault, the notion of care for the self (epimeleia heautou,) following a traditionally Western (Ancient Greek and Roman) interpretation of self-care comprises an attitude towards the self, others, and the world, as well as a certain form of attention. For Foucault, the pursuit of the care for one's own well-being also comprises self-knowledge (gnōthi seauton).

Later on, the self-care deficit nursing theory was developed by Dorothea Orem between 1959 and 2001. This popular Western theory centers on the medical facet of self-care, and explores the use professional care and an orientation towards resources. Under Orem's model self-care has limits when its possibilities have been exhausted therefore making professional care legitimate. These deficits in self-care are seen as shaping the best role a nurse may provide. There are two phases in Orem's self-care: the investigative and decision-making phase, and the production phase. Under this theory, Orem begins to assess the importance of others and support in a more communal form of self-care, while still centering on the physical and medical aspects of care as opposed to the more spiritual or radical political resistance theories. This idea of communal care was pioneered by the Black feminist community in an effort to preserve themselves and resist oppression.

== Self-Care in the Workplace ==
Self-care in the workplace have been associated with positive employee well-being and organizational productivity. Trauma-informed models of care include self-care practices as a critical component of organizational health. Self-care helps employees to manage their stress levels and prevent burnout. Organizational self-care has been associated with improved job satisfaction, reduced absenteeism, and enhanced job performance.

Self-care practices that employees can engage in, in the workplace include setting healthy working boundaries, engaging in regular breaks, participating in wellness programs, fostering supportive relationships with colleagues and maintaining work-life balance.

In high-stress professions such as healthcare, education, and social work, the responsibility of self-care extends beyond the individual and becomes a shared organizational duty. Some scholars argue that institutional factors such as heavy workloads, lack of autonomy, can undermine individual self-care efforts, suggesting the needs for systemic interventions alongside personal practices. In addition to acknowledging and assessing organization problems, organizational self-care includes institutional policies and advocacy that encourage employees to use:

- Employee assistance programs
- Paid time off (sick and vacation)
- Healthcare
- Flexible Work Arrangements
- Staff Satisfaction Surveys
- Supportive and frequent supervision
- Training
- Spaces to engage in self care
- Wellness Programs (diet/exercise plans)

== Self-Care and Capitalism ==
The intersection of self-care and capitalism has generated scholarly discussion. Self-care was originally established as behaviors to ensure holistic well-being of oneself. As self-care has entered the mainstream, it has been refined as a set of consumer behaviors such as buying expensive self-care products and services.

Commercialized self-care can create a barrier to access of self-care, allowing for self-care to be more readily accessible to those with financial means. Marketing self-care products or services as "essential" can reinforce cycles of over consumption or create an unattainable vision of self-care

== See also ==
- Americans with Disabilities Act of 1990 § Major life activities
- Executive functioning
- Integrative medicine
- Public space
- Shelter (building)
