= National Fibromyalgia Association =

US nonprofit organization

- Founded: 1997
- Founder: Lynne Matallana; Karen Lee Richards
- Type: 501(c)(3)
- Purpose: Patient education and support Medical education programs Facilitating research
- Location: Newport Beach, California
- Region served: International
- Product: Education
- Method: Assistance to support groups Fibromyalgia AWARE Magazine; Fibromyalgia Awareness Day; Leaders Against Pain Coalition; Legislative lobbying Ongoing media presence
- Key people: Founder:Executive Director: Lynne Matallana Board of directors: Richard Matallana; Michael Seffinger, DO, FAAFP; Craig Kennedy; Bas Mulder
- Website: fmaware.org

The National Fibromyalgia Association (NFA) is a nonprofit organization whose purpose is to help improve the quality of life for people living with fibromyalgia (FM) and other chronic pain conditions. The NFA has worked to build international awareness of this chronic pain disorder, provide patient assistance and support, educate the medical community, facilitate and implement research, and build collaboration between the patient, health care providers and scientific communities.

== Mission ==
The National Fibromyalgia Association's mission is to help people affected by FM by organizing awareness events, media coverage, support and training for support group leaders across the United States. The NFA produces informational materials, hosts patient and health care provider web sites, and publishes the magazine Fibromyalgia AWARE.

== Development ==
First known as the National Fibromyalgia Awareness Campaign, the NFA was founded as a 501(c)(3) nonprofit organization in 1997 in Orange, California, by Lynne Matallana and Karen Lee Richards. The organization developed an educational website FMaware.org In 2002, the organization also began publishing a magazine quarterly titled Fibromyalgia AWARE, which at the time was the only consumer magazine that was focused on fibromyalgia patient community issues.

Through 2006, the NFA hosted six international conferences, featuring authorities on fibromyalgia who presented their research and expertise to attendees, including patients and health care professionals. More than 1,000 people attended the 2006 FAME (Fibromyalgia Awareness Means Everything) conference.

The NFA partnered with Johns Hopkins School of Medicine and the Institute of Johns Hopkins Nursing in 2007, to form "The Fibromyalgia Circle of Care", a collaboration that hold three annual initiatives that work to assist healthcare providers in diagnosing fibromyalgia, raising awareness of the condition, and taking care of patients diagnosed with the illness.

The NFA has been covered by various media sources, including National Public Radio, Newsweek, The Gazette, and United Press International.

== Founders ==
Co-founders Matallana and Richards have both been diagnosed with fibromyalgia. They first met in 1997 through discussions in online fibromyalgia chat groups, and shared similar concerns over incorrect diagnoses as well as a lack of available information and patient support. Matallana had first experienced symptoms of pain and fatigue in 1993, and by 1997 had visited 37 doctors before being diagnosed with fibromyalgia. Richards said that she had become ill in 1989, but did not receive a diagnosis of Fibromyalgia until 1996. After the two met, they organized gatherings with other fibromyalgia patients who wanted to increase public awareness of the issue, initiating the National Fibromyalgia Awareness Campaign, which developed over the following five years to become the NFA. Matallana has been president of the NFA since 1997 and was publisher and editor-in-chief of Fibromyalgia AWARE magazine from 2002 until 2012. Richards served as NFA's vice president from 1997 through 2006.
