= Self-care deficit nursing theory =

Allowing self-care so far as possible

The self-care deficit nursing theory is a grand nursing theory that was developed between 1959 and 2001 by Dorothea Orem. The theory is also referred to as the Orem's Model of Nursing. It is particularly used in rehabilitation and primary care settings, where the patient is encouraged to be as independent as possible.

== Central philosophy ==
The nursing theory is based upon the philosophy that all "patients wish to care for themselves". They can recover more quickly and holistically if they are allowed to perform their own self-cares to the best of their ability. Orem's self-care deficit nursing theory emphasized on establishing the nursing perspectives regarding human and practice.

== Self-care requisites ==
Self-care requisites are groups of needs or requirements that Orem identified. They are classified as either:

- Universal self-care requisites (needs that all people have)
- Developmental self-care requisites:
  - maturational: progress toward higher levels of maturation
  - situational: prevention of deleterious effects related to development
- Health deviation requisites: those needs that arise as a result of a patient's condition.

== Self-care deficits ==
When an individual is unable to meet their own self-care requisites, a "self-care deficit" occurs. It is the job of the Registered Nurse to determine these deficits, and define a support modality.

== Support modalities ==
Nurses are encouraged to rate their patient's dependencies or each of the self-care deficits on the following scale:

- Total Compensation
- Partial Compensation
- Educative/Supportive

== Universal Self-Care Requisites (SCRs) ==
The Universal Self-Care Requisites that are needed for health are:

- Air
- Water
- Food
- Elimination
- Activity and Rest
- Solitude and Social Interaction
- Hazard Prevention
- Promotion of Normality

The nurse is encouraged to assign a support modality to each of the self-care requisites.
