= Disaboom =

- Website type: Social networking service
- Available in: English
- Founders: J. Glen House, MD; J.W. Roth
- Website: www.disaboom.com
- Commercial: Yes
- Registration: Required for participation in discussions and blogs; optional for most other services
- Users: 90,000
- Launched: 2007; 19 years ago
- Current status: Offline since 2010

Disaboom was a social networking service for people with disabilities, as well as their family members, friends, caregivers, and employers.

It was the largest social network service and information resource for people with disabilities and had 90,000 registered users. In July 2008, the website had 21,000 daily visits.

It received revenue from advertising.

The company was headquartered in Lone Tree, Colorado.

The website was shut down in 2010.

== History ==
Disaboom.com was founded in September 2006 by J. Glen House, MD, a board-certified physician specializing in the area of spinal cord injury. Rendered a C-7 quadriplegic after breaking his neck in a skiing accident at the age of 20, Dr. House went on to pursue a career in medicine despite losing the use of his legs and dexterity in his hands. The first student in a wheelchair to graduate from the University of Washington School of Medicine, he is board certified in both Physical Medicine and Rehabilitation and Spinal Cord Medicine. In addition to being an integral part of disaboom.com, he is the President of the Colorado Rehabilitation Physicians, President of the medical device company Flexlife, and medical director of the Center for Neuro & Trauma Rehabilitation at Penrose Hospital in Colorado Springs, Colorado. April 23, 2013 – Disaboom moved its focus to media aggregation and advocacy with this move it shutdown its primary websites.

In April 2007, the company raised $2.89 million by selling shares in a private placement for 50 cents each. In May 2007, the company received approval to list its stock on the OTC Bulletin Board.

== Site organization ==
The disaboom.com model integrated social networking features that provide members with tools to blog, participate in discussion boards, and engage in real time chat. Additionally, the site provides health and lifestyle articles that are written by professionals and updated regularly.

=== Health ===
The health section features articles written by medical professionals on a variety of disabilities including cerebral palsy, muscular dystrophy, multiple sclerosis, fibromyalgia and other disabilities and functional limitations. Articles on pain medication, rehabilitation, and mental health issues are also present. The site is updated regularly with new articles.

=== Living ===
The living section contained articles on Intimate relationships, health and physical fitness, sports, recreation, and living with disabilities. Although the content is catered towards those with disabilities, the subject matter is often not specific to the disabled community, and may have general appeal.

=== Media Room ===
The media room features video of individuals with disabilities skiing, snowboarding, playing basketball, lifting weights and engaging in other physical activities. Many individuals featured in the Media Room videos have a spinal cord injury, including rap artists Four Wheel City.

== Community ==
Disaboom members had the option of setting up their own User profiles, which included an avatar, a biography, and the option to start a blog. Recent blog posts were displayed in the main community section. Members were also able to select other members as their favorites. The activity of a member's favorites was tracked and summarized using the "My Disaboom" feature.

=== Discussions ===
The disaboom.com discussion section contained over 35 Internet forums, with over 7,000 threads ranging from health conditions to relationship advice, political dialogue, and more. Only sysops were able to start forums, but any member was able to create a new topic.

=== Reviews ===
The disaboom.com review section contained reviews on the accessibility and quality of restaurants, hotels, resorts, attractions, medical equipment, and other items such as automobiles and miscellaneous consumer electronics.

=== Career Center ===
The Disaboom career center offered employment listings targeted toward people with disabilities. Some listings were for companies that hired continually for positions available to those with disabilities, while other listings are for specific opportunities.

== Advertising campaign ==
Disaboom's initial advertising campaign focused on featuring musicians, athletes, parents, and models with disabilities who have successful careers in their fields. Paralympian John Register, actor and amputee John Siciliano, and the hip-hop duo Four Wheel City—composed of two rappers who were paralyzed from stray gunshot wounds—were all featured. The ads also took stereotypes of disabled people and used their deprecating language in empowering ways.
