= Stroke in China =

Health issue in China

Recent epidemiologic studies confirm that stroke is the most frequent cause of death in the People's Republic of China, with an incidence more than fivefold that of myocardial infarction. Intracerebral hemorrhage causes about one third of all strokes, nearly three times the frequency in North American stroke registries. A marked regional variation in stroke incidence exists, with a threefold higher stroke incidence in northern than in southern Chinese cities, suggesting important environmental or dietary influences. Stroke treatment often involves a combination of modern and traditional herbal medicine; the latter may modify platelet aggregation and blood viscosity. Stroke, particularly intracerebral hemorrhage, is the most frequent and important vascular disorder in China.

China reports more patients with stroke than anywhere else in the world. While there is still a great deal of unknown information, stroke research has been making great progress in recent years, such as in the areas of clinical research, population and genetic epidemiology, brain ischemia/reperfusion exploring, leukoencephalopathy (CADASIL), neural stem cell and stroke, neuroprotective treatment for stroke, clinical therapy test in stroke, rehabilitation and prevention.

Cities and towns in China have integrated systems for registering and investigating strokes. Chinese researchers have followed closely the international level of stroke treatment with a forward position in neural stem cell. Traditional Chinese drugs have featured effects on neuroprotective treatment for stroke which has also been investigated. Chinese scientists have suggested a new way of dividing neuroprotectors in stroke. The clinical therapy test with urokinase and defibrase for cerebral infarction in China is effective and relatively safe, yet the original papers published by Chinese researchers and clinical effects for patient treatment still need to be improved and updated.

== Epidemiology ==
Stroke is the second most common cause of death and leading cause of adult disability in China. Chronic diseases now account for an estimated 80% of deaths and 70% of disability-adjusted life-years lost in China.

The major causes of death in China are vascular disease, cancer, and chronic respiratory disease. Unlike in western countries, cerebrovascular disease predominates; the number of patients who die from stroke is more than three times that from coronary heart disease.

In the past 20 years, China has experienced a rapid economic development. Over time, the proportion of elderly people in the population will likely increase, life expectancies will lengthen, and, as in some other developing countries, the influence of a westernized lifestyle might shift disease patterns towards a profile more similar to that seen in more developed regions, so that the number of strokes will rise.

Total age-adjusted incidence of first-ever stroke in China is not very different from that in developed countries. Stroke incidence, mortality, and prevalence varies widely among different regions within China, with a noticeable north–south gradient. The proportion of intracerebral haemorrhage was high and reached 55% in one city.

Hypertension is the most important risk factor for stroke. The mass approach combined with a high-risk approach for stroke prevention showed encouraging effects, and various unconventional local therapeutic traditions are commonly used to treat stroke in China.

Several national guidelines on stroke prevention and treatment have been developed. Because of methodological limitations in the epidemiology studies, official government data have been unreliable in terms of making any firm conclusions. There have been calls for urgently needed up-to-date, well-designed, and well-done epidemiological studies and therapeutic trials in China.

== See also ==
- Clinical trial
- good clinical practice
- Clinical research associate
- International Conference on Harmonisation of Technical Requirements for Registration of Pharmaceuticals for Human Use
- Health informatics
- National Institute for Health and Clinical Excellence - UK
- CHIMES Society - Singapore NGO
