= Chronic disease in Northern Ontario =

Chronic disease in Northern Ontario is a population health problem. The population in Northern Ontario experiences worse outcomes on a number of important health indicators, including higher rates of chronic disease compared to the population in the rest of Ontario (Romanow, 2002).

== Population under consideration ==
Northern Ontario is over 800,000 square kilometers, covering nearly 90% of the area of Ontario. Its population of close to 800,000 represents only 6% of the total population for the province. This large land area and relatively small population results in a density of approximately one person per square kilometre, compared to 115 persons per square kilometre in Southern Ontario. Northern Ontario's rural population comprises more than 30% of the total Northern population. In Southern Ontario, only 11% of the population lives in rural area. Over 50% of the North's population live in the five biggest cities of Thunder Bay, Sault Ste. Marie, Timmins, Greater Sudbury, and North Bay. With mining, forestry and tourism as the major local industries, there are peaks and troughs in the economy, and unemployment rates are usually higher than in the remainder of Ontario (MNDM, 2011).

The estimated area of Local Health Integration Network (LHIN) 13 is 400,000 square kilometres or approximately 40% of Ontario, with a population of 551,691. In LHIN 13, 17% of the population is 65 years of age or older, which is significantly higher than the provincial average of 14%. LHIN 13 is diverse with 24% of the population Francophone and 10% of the population First Nations (North East LHIN, 2009). The estimated area of LHIN 14 is 470,000 square kilometers or approximately 47% of Ontario, with a population of 234,599. In LHIN 14, 14.3% of the population is 65 years of age or older. LHIN 14 is diverse with 3.5% of the population Francophone and 19.8% First Nations (North West LHIN, 2009).

== Scope of the health problem ==
According to the World Health Organization, chronic diseases are defined as diseases of long duration which generally show slow progression (WHO, 2012a). Examples of chronic diseases are cardiovascular disease, respiratory disease, stroke, cancer, and diabetes. The main risk factors associated with chronic diseases are tobacco and alcohol use, physical inactivity and unhealthy diets (WHO, 2011). Almost 80% of Ontarians over the age of 45 have a chronic condition, and treatment for these diseases amount to 55% of Ontario's total health costs (MOHLTC, 2007). In Northern Ontario the rates of chronic diseases are higher than the average provincial rates (MOHLTC, 2011).

== Current environment surrounding the problem ==
In rural and Northern Ontario, life expectancy is less than the provincial average; disability rates are higher in smaller communities; rates for accidents, poisoning and violence are also higher in smaller communities; and people living in remote northern communities are the least healthy and have the lowest life and disability-free life expectancies (North East LHIN, 2009; North West LHIN, 2009). On average, Northern communities have a higher infant mortality rate than Southern communities, reflecting a lower overall health status (MOHLTC, 2011; Appendix B). The Northern Ontario population has higher rates of a number of chronic diseases such as cardiovascular disease, respiratory disease, stroke, cancer and diabetes (North East LHIN, 2009; North West LHIN, 2009). There is a higher proportion of the population that are overweight or obese and a higher proportion of the population that are heavy drinkers and smokers (North East LHIN, 2009; North West LHIN, 2009).

== Interactions and dynamics related to the problem ==
Analysis of the burden of chronic disease has pointed to the importance of risk factors, such as being overweight, smoking, alcohol, and poor diet. These are indeed potent causes of chronic disease, however considering the causes of chronic disease entails a richer understanding of the determinants of health. There is a need to examine the causes of the causes: the social conditions that give rise to high risk behaviours of chronic diseases. A social determinants lens is crucial when addressing chronic diseases in Northern Ontario (Marmot, 2005).

The determinants of health (listed in Appendix A) are defined as the diverse set of factors that affect health and pertain to the conditions in which people are born, grow, live, work, and age (WHO, 2012b). The Canadian Institute for Advanced Research estimates that 75% of the health of the population is determined by factors outside of the health care system (Mackie, 2012). The determinants of health (DOH) contribute to and exacerbate the worse health outcomes in the LHIN 13 and 14 population. For example, in Northern Ontario, there are higher rates of unemployment and lower rates of education compared to the rest of Ontario (North East LHIN, 2009; North West LHIN, 2009). Low education and unemployment, which are DOH in themselves, are also obvious risk factors for poverty, which is a very significant DOH. This exemplifies the complexity of the problem, as the DOH can interact and have synergistic effects. Furthermore, problems in access to health services in Northern Ontario quite often stem from distance and shortages of health human resources (Romanow, 2002). On average there is less than one physician per 1,000 people in rural areas, compared to two or more physicians per 1,000 people in larger urban centres (ICES, 2006).

Demographic and other factors aggravate this population health problem. Northern Ontario has 106 of the 134 Aboriginal communities in Ontario (MNDM, 2011). The health status of Aboriginal people is overall worse than other Ontarians on most measures, including life expectancy, infant mortality, cardiovascular disease prevalence, diabetes prevalence and suicides (Health Council of Canada, 2005). Aboriginal populations also lag behind in almost all DOH (Health Council of Canada, 2005). For example, social support networks are limited for many Aboriginal people due to the residential school act and its legacy. Many Aboriginal people have been unable to establish effective relationships with families and friends as a result of being taken away at an early age from their communities. The usual social bonds that occur with family members, friends and community members were severely and permanently damaged, leaving this population particularly vulnerable (Health Council of Canada, 2005).

== Existing public policies and corporate strategies ==
There are numerous policies and strategies that have been implemented to address chronic disease prevention and management in Northern Ontario. The existing policies and strategies range from cardiovascular disease prevention programs (for example Heart Health Ontario) to diabetes education programs (for example the Northern Diabetes Health Network) (MOHLTC, 2011). Although it is good that chronic disease prevention and management is not being neglected in Northern Ontario, there is some concern about the effectiveness and efficiency of all these different initiatives. The Centre for Rural and Northern Health Research reported that although health care organizations and relevant stakeholders were progressing towards implementing chronic disease management strategies, there was limited integration of programs at the community and regional levels. It was reported that there was a lack of communication impacting the coordination of services, to the extent that organizations were operating within separate silos, resulting in a lack of collaboration between the various organizations. There appears to be a similar situation in the North East LHIN (Minore, Hill & Perry, 2009).

== Assessment of options for chronic disease prevention and management ==
Prevention and management of chronic disease requires a comprehensive set of initiatives. Below will outline a number of options, using the applicable determinants of health as a framework, that can help make a difference in addressing chronic disease in Northern Ontario (LHINs 13 and 14).

Personal Health Practices and Coping Skills
Personal Health Practices and coping skills refer to those actions by which individuals can prevent diseases and promote self-care. These skills are very important in the prevention and management of chronic disease (PHAC, 2003).
Patient Self-Management
The North West LHIN's Community Care Access Centre is training patients in self-management using Stanford University's six-week "Healthy Change with Chronic Conditions" workshop. Through this workshop, 75 to 100 people in LHIN 14 have been trained as master trainers. The trainers have a condition requiring management and have volunteered to support and teach others in their community with the same condition. At the end of the training, patients have gained a greater understanding of their condition and could successfully manage their condition at home. Researchers from Stanford University, through the evaluation of a randomized control trial, showed that participants experienced improved health behaviors and health status (Lorig, Sobel, Ritter, Laurent, & Hobbs, 2001).
Tele-services
Through telecommunications, a range of tele-services are available to help patients and their families manage chronic conditions. Here are three such services:

i) Telehomecare
Telehomecare involves an electronic 2-way communication between the patient and the care provider, generally a nurse. The communication is usually in the form of audio/video conferencing, using the Internet. In addition to conferencing, medical monitoring equipment can be installed in the patient's home, and readings transmitted electronically to the care provider. Patient satisfaction is high with this type of intervention (Finkelstein, Speedie, & Pottfoff, 2006).

ii) Telehomecare Support For Informal Caregivers
Informal caregiving is unpaid caregiving that is usually provided by relatives, friends or neighbours. Often the informal caregivers experience physical, emotional and financial stress, isolation, depression and a perceived lack of support (Hogenbirk, Libroiron-Grenier, Pong & Young, 2005). Several telehealth interventions have been designed to reach out to informal caregivers and reduce their levels of stress, by providing counseling via videophone or providing platforms where caregivers can meet each other online and take part in skills development programs (Buckwalter, David, Wakefield, Kienzle, & Murray, 2002).

iii) Televisitation
The Televisitation Program at Thunder Bay Regional Health Sciences Centre facilitates patient and family member communication through a face-to-face, real-time secure video connection during the patient's hospital stay. Televisitation reduces feelings of isolation on the part of the patient, aids in recovery, and prepares the patient's family for caregiving upon discharge (Petersen, 2011). As a result, caregiving is better for the patient and less stressful for the caregivers (K. Shields, personal communication, March 15, 2012).

Social Support Networks
Support from families, friends and communities is associated with better health and enables people to deal with adversity. These social support networks are significant determinants in effectively managing health problems such as chronic disease (PHAC, 2003).
Family-Directed Respite Care
Respite care is care that provides a primary, often informal, caregiver temporary relief from caring for an ill individual. In the North West LHIN, the vast distances makes hiring agency respite care very expensive. In 2009, a pilot project using an innovative model of respite care was developed in the District of Thunder Bay in cooperation with the Wesway agency, that maximizes choice, flexibility, cultural sensitivity, family empowerment and cost-effectiveness. The family receives money from the agency, manages the funds, and decides who will provide respite services and for how long. Families were very satisfied with the program. Based on the successful results, the project was extended to 2011 (North West LHIN, 2010).
Culture and Social Environments
In LHINs 13 and 14, approximately 30% of the population is First Nations. Culture is a significant determinant of health in the Aboriginal population in Northern Ontario. Aboriginals face additional health risks due to their socio-economic environment, which is largely determined by dominant cultural values that contribute to the perpetuation of conditions such as marginalization, stigmatization, loss or devaluation of language and culture and lack of access to culturally appropriate health care and services (PHAC, 2003). Elders play an important role is the Aboriginal community and can contribute to improved health outcomes with chronic disease management in a variety of ways. Working with and empowering Aboriginal leaders to promote health and well-being is a culturally sensitive option to address chronic disease prevention and management (Northern Ontario Medical Journal, 2011).
Physical Environments
In the built environment, factors related to housing, indoor air quality, and the design of communities can significantly influence chronic disease management. Aboriginal people are more likely to live in over-crowded dwellings compared to the rest of Ontarians and about 30.6% of Aboriginal households are in need of major repairs compared to 8.2% for Ontario (Health Council of Canada, 2005). Reducing harmful impacts from the built environment is a complex undertaking and would have to be done in targeted measurable steps to prove feasible. Smoking cessation programs to reduce the exposure to second-hand smoke in the home and community would be an example of a manageable and cost-effective intervention to better prevent chronic disease in this population.
Health Services
Health services, particularly those designed to maintain and promote health, to prevent disease, and to restore health and function contribute to population health (PHAC, 2003). Health human resources are an integral part of health services and play a fundamental role in providing care (PHAC, 2003).

Northern Ontario School of Medicine
The Northern Ontario School of Medicine (NOSM) is a joint initiative of Laurentian University, Lakehead University and the Government of Ontario. It focuses on medical education that addresses the unique needs of rural and Northern Ontario so graduates are prepared to work in these areas (NOSM, 2012). Observational studies showed that health professionals from rural and Northern backgrounds are more likely to return to work in rural and Northern communities. Quasi-randomized trials demonstrated that clinical rotations in an underserviced setting increased medical students' likelihood to subsequently work in an underserviced area (WHO, 2009).

Nurse Practitioners
In Ontario, Nurse Practitioners (NPs) are registered nurses with additional education and experience. According to recent statistics, there were approximately 800 primary health care NPs working in Ontario in 2007 (Government of Ontario, 2009). A 1999 Ontario study estimated that NPs are capable of handling 82.6% of patient care, with the remainder requiring physician referral (CNA, 2002). Various research studies and analyses demonstrate that costs for care provided by NPs or NP/physician teams are considerably less than care provided by physicians within office visits or by physician-only teams (Health Canada, 2006).

Physician Assistants
In Canada, physician assistants support physicians in a range of health care settings and work under the direction of a licensed physician to provide patient care. Since 2007, Ontario's Physician Assistant (PA) initiative has been introducing PAs to a number of different health care settings through a series of demonstration projects across the province. Evidence shows that PAs help to improve access to health services and overall quality of care (Government of Ontario, 2010). A systematic review spanning 30 years and examining the use of the physician assistant model of care provision was undertaken by O'Connor and Hooker (2007). The review found that the quality of care was similar to care provided by a physician. Hospitals that had PAs on staff "found that they could substitute about 50-75% of a doctor's work with one PA" (O'Connor and Hooker, 2007, p. 348).

== See also ==
- Healthcare in Canada

== Sources ==
- Bradley, J.(2012). Telemedicine. Retrieved from http://www.caregiver.com
- Buckwalter, K.C., David, L.L., Wakefield, B.J., Kienzle, M.G. and Murray, M.A. (2002). Telehealth for elders and their caregivers in rural communities. Family and Community Health, 25(3), 31–40.
- Canadian Nurses Association (CNA). (2002). Cost-effectiveness of the nurse practitioner role. Retrieved from https://web.archive.org/web/20080916214902/http://23072.vws.magma.ca/
- Centre for Rural and Northern Health Research Lakehead and Laurentian Universities. (2009). Exploring the socio-economic impact of the Northern Ontario School of Medicine: Final report. Retrieved from www.nosm.ca
- Canadian Institute for Health Information (CIHI). (2012). Disparities in primary health care experiences among Canadians with ambulatory care sensitive conditions. Retrieved from https://web.archive.org/web/20120407122052/https://secure.cihi.ca/
- Drummond, D. (2012).Commission on the reform of Ontario's public services. Retrieved from http://news.ontario.ca
- Finkelstein, S. Speedie, S.M., and Pottfoff, S. (2006). Home telehealth improves clinical outcomes at lower cost for home healthcare. Telemedicine and Health,12 (2), 128–136.
- Government of Ontario (2009). Nurse practitioners. Retrieved from http://www.healthforceontario.ca/WhatIsHFO/FAQs/NursePractitioners.aspx
- Government of Ontario (2010). Physician assistants. Retrieved from http://www.healthforceontario.ca/WhatIsHFO/FAQs/PhysicianAssistants.aspx
- Health Canada. (2006). Nursing issues: Primary health care nurse practitioners. Retrieved from http://www.hc-sc.gc.ca/hcs-sss/pubs/nurs-infirm/onp-bpsi-fs-if/2006-np-ip-eng.php#fn_13
- Health Council of Canada. (2005). The health status of Canada's First Nations, Métis and Inuit peoples. Retrieved from http://healthcouncilcanada.ca
- Hogenbirk, J.C., Libroiron-Grenier, L., Pong, R.W. and Young, N.L. (2005). How can telehomecare support informal care? Retrieved form http://www.nelhin.on.ca
- Lorig, K.R., Sobel, D.S., Ritter, P.L., Laurent, D., Hobbs, M. (2001). Effect of a self-management program on patients with chronic disease. Effective Clinical Practice, 4 (6), 256–262.
- Mackie, C. (2012). Overview of population health management [PowerPoint]. Retrieved from https://avenue.cllmcmaster.ca
- Marmot, M. (2005). Social determinants of health inequalities. Lancet, 365 (9464),: 1099–104.
- Ministry of Health and Long Term Care. (2007). Preventing and managing chronic disease: Ontario's framework. Retrieved from www.health.gov.on.ca
- Ministry of Health and Long Term Care. (2011). Rural and northern health care framework. Retrieved from www.health.gov.on.ca
- Ministry of Northern Development and Mines. (2011). Northern Ontario a profile. Retrieved from http://www.mndm.gov.on.ca
- Minore, Hill & Perry. (2009). Environmental scan: Chronic disease prevention and management for the North West LHIN. Retrieved from http://www.northwestlhin.on.ca
- North East Local Health Integration Network. (2009). Integrated health services plan. Retrieved from http://www.nelhin.on.ca
- North West Local Health Integration Network. (2009). Integrated health service plan. Retrieved from http://www.northwestlhin.on.ca
- Northern Ontario Medical Journal. (2011). Handbook outlines elder's role. Retrieved from http://www.nomj.ca
- Northern Ontario School of Medicine. (2012). About us. Retrieved from http://www.nosm.ca
- O'Connor, T.M. and Hooker R.S. (2007). Extending rural and remote medicine with a new type of health worker: Physician assistants. Australian Journal of Rural Health, 15 (6), 346–351.
- Petersen B. (2011). Northern Ontario Medical Journal. Retrieved from http://www.nomj.ca/Articles/Technology/12-11-Televisitation.aspx
- Piérard, E. (2009) The effect of physician supply on health status as measured in the NPHS. Retrieved from http://economics.uwaterloo.ca
- Pong & Russell (2003). Policy recommendations on the rural health workforce. Retrieved from http://ruralontarioinstitute.ca
- Romanow, R. (2002). Building on values: The future of health care in Canada. Retrieved from http://dsp-psd.pwgsc.gc.ca
- Sempowski, I.P. (2004). Effectiveness of financial incentives in exchange for rural and underserviced area return-of-service commitments: systematic review of the literature. Canadian Journal of Rural Medicine, 9(2), 82–88.
- Watson, D., Black, C., Reid, R. (2012). UBC Centre for health services and policy research, primary health care in BC physician supply, distribution and practice collocation. Retrieved from www.chspr.ubc.ca
- Watson & McGrail. (2009). More doctors or better care? Health Care Policy, 5(1), 26–31.
- World Health Organization. (2009). Increasing access to health workers in rural and remote areas through improved retention. Retrieved from www.who.int
- World Health Organization. (2011).Chronic diseases and health promotion. Retrieved from http://www.who.int/chp/en/index.html
- World Health Organization. (2012a). Chronic diseases. Retrieved from www.who.int
- World Health Organization. (2012b). Social determinants of health. Retrieved from http://www.who.int/social_determinants/en/
