= Susan Murphy =

American statistician

- Born: Susan Allbritton Murphy; April 16, 1958 (age 68)
- Education: B.S., Louisiana State University, 1980 (Mathematics), Ph.D., University of North Carolina, 1989 (Statistics)
- Occupation: Statistician
- Employer: Harvard University
- Organization(s): The Methodology Center, Penn State
- Known for: Applying statistical methods to clinical trials of treatments for chronic and relapsing medical conditions

Susan Allbritton Murphy (born April 16, 1958) is an American statistician, known for her work applying statistical methods to clinical trials of treatments for chronic and relapsing medical conditions. She is a professor at Harvard University, a MacArthur Fellow, and a member of the National Academy of Sciences.

== Biography and career ==
She grew up in rural Louisiana, and is "a serious hockey player for the Brighton Solar Bears at Warrior Ice Arena" She graduated from Louisiana State University with a B.S. and from the University of North Carolina with a Ph.D. Her 1989 dissertation, Time-Dependent Coefficients in a Cox-Type Regression Model, was supervised by Pranab K. Sen.

Murphy was an Assistant and Associate Professor of Statistics at Pennsylvania State University from fall 1989 to fall 1997. She was an Associate and full Professor of Statistics at the University of Michigan from spring 1998 to summer 2017. She is a Professor of Statistics at Harvard University as of fall 2017. She is also a principal investigator at The Methodology Center, at Penn State.

She is developing "new methodologies to evaluate courses of treatment for individuals coping with chronic or relapsing disorders ... Murphy’s Sequential Multiple Assignment Randomized Trial (SMART) is a means for learning how best to dynamically adapt treatment to each individual’s response over time. Using SMART, clinicians assess and modify patients’ treatments during the trial, an approach with potential applications in the treatment of a range of chronic diseases—such as ADHD, alcoholism, drug addiction, HIV/AIDS, and cardiovascular disease—that involve therapies that are regularly reconsidered and replaced as the disease progresses.

Murphy is a Professor of Statistics at Harvard University and a Professor of Computer Science at the Harvard John A. Paulson School of Engineering and Applied Sciences. She is also affiliated with Harvard's Radcliffe Institute for Advanced Study as a Radcliffe Alumnae Professor.

== Recognition ==
She won a 2013 MacArthur Fellowship. In 2015 she gave the Bradley Lecture at the University of Georgia. In 2016, she was elected to the National Academy of Sciences. She was the R. A. Fisher Lecturer in 2018. In 2018, she was elected president of the Institute of Mathematical Statistics.

She is also a Fellow of the American Statistical Association and of the Institute of Mathematical Statistics.

== See also ==
- Dynamic treatment regime
