= Mortgage slave =

Mortgage slave (Chinese: 房奴; pinyin: fángnú) is a term used for homeowners in China who spend more than 70% of their disposable income towards repaying mortgage loans. Continually rising real estate prices and high incentives for home ownership have encouraged restrictive loans to those wishing to own a residence, but lacking the required wealth. The resulting loans have had a deteriorative effect on the indebted, who are left with little money to invest or otherwise improve their financial position and standard of living.

== Causes ==
Housing demand in urban China has greatly increased. Export-oriented economy and educational opportunities in Chinese cities have accelerated the country's urbanization, as have cities with available public goods limiting their access to residents who have purchased and registered real estate. Further raising the demand are distrust in the country's social safety net, cultural expectation for long-term residences, and "poor public housing implementation" that has left affordable housing hard to find. An inflated industry increases GDP statistics, the primary criteria for promoting public officials, which promotes governmental inaction. Real estate companies, banks, the government, and already-established urban residents have indirectly increased prices by speculating on the booming market.

== Effects ==
Because most of their disposable income is spent repaying the loan, mortgage slaves have an extremely tight budget. They have little or no money left for increasing their wealth through investment, which leaves them chained to the loans for long periods of time, or for consumption, which pushes down their standard of living, social standing, and personal development as well as the country's consumer economy.

== Solutions ==
In the NPC and CPPCC sessions since 2010, the housing issue has become one of the most commonly discussed topics. Current or planned regulations to bring housing prices to a more manageable level include increasing the down payment of the land grant fee for real estate companies, increasing the down payment of those who purchase a second real estate property, and increasing the interest rate to curb excessive speculation on the real estate market. Others concern the fundamental well-being of the entire Chinese people, such as through improving income distribution by tax leverage, the social security system for both rural and urban residents, and the economic development model.
