= Erica Moodie =

Canadian biostatistician

Erica Eleanor Margret Moodie is a Canadian biostatistician known for her work on dynamic treatment regimes. She is Canada Research Chair and Professor in the Department of Epidemiology, Biostatistics, and Occupational Health at McGill University.

== Education and career ==
Moodie graduated from the University of Winnipeg in 2000 with a double major in mathematics and statistics. She earned a master's degree in epidemiology at the University of Cambridge in 2001, a second master's degree in biostatistics at the University of Washington in 2004, and a Ph.D. in biostatistics at the University of Washington in 2006. Her dissertation was Inference for optimal dynamic treatment regimes, and was supervised by Thomas Richardson.

She has been on the McGill University faculty since 2006.

== Books ==
With B. Chakraborty, Moodie is the coauthor of the book Statistical Methods for Dynamic Treatment Regimes: Reinforcement Learning, Causal Inference, and Personalized Medicine (Springer, 2013). She is the co-editor, with M. R. Kosorok, of Adaptive Treatment Strategies in Practice: Planning Trials and Analyzing Data for Personalized Medicine (SIAM, 2016). She is also the co-editor of Handbook of Statistical Methods for Precision Medicine (CRC Press, 2024) along with T. Cai, B. Chakraborty, E. Laber, and M. van der Laan.

== Recognition ==
Moodie became an Elected Member of the International Statistical Institute in 2015. She was the 2020 winner of the CRM-SSC Prize in Statistics "for her outstanding contributions to biostatistics, notably in causal inference, precision medicine, and dynamic treatment regimes, and her influential contributions to substantive areas of application such as HIV and mental health". She was elected to the 2025 class of Fellows of the American Statistical Association.

== Family ==
Moodie is originally from Winnipeg, Manitoba; her parents, Ric Moodie and Patricia F. Moodie, are a zoologist and biostatistician respectively, and her older sister Zoe Moodie, brother-in-law Jonathan Wakefield, and husband David A. Stephens are all also (bio)statisticians.
