= Beijing's License Lottery =

2011 car license plate lottery

Beijing's License Lottery was implemented in 2011 to address traffic congestion and air pollution in China's capital. The lottery issues new car license plates to residents in order to limit the number of cars on the road.

== Background ==
The economic development and population growth of China in recent decades have provided the conditions for an exponential increase in car ownership that has improved the living conditions in the country. The GDP per capita in 2000 was $2,915 and $11,218 in 2010, a growth rate of 14% annually. The population between 1990 and 2000 grew 26%, followed by a 44% growth from 2000 and 2010. The number of vehicles in the capital almost tripled from less than 2 million to 5 million between 2000 and 2011. This has contributed to extreme air pollution in Beijing, traffic congestion, and the rapid, insatiable demand for energy.

== Previous methods ==
Beijing has attempted to use a multitude of methods to address these issues including a parking certificate system in 1998, a 10% vehicle purchase tax in 2004, an expansion of public transportation in 2005, a low-price public transport policy in 2007, and a license plate restriction in 2008. Yet, these methods proved ineffective in reducing vehicle sales, traffic congestion, and air pollution.

== License Plate Lottery ==
In 2011, Beijing began distributing new license plates through a bi-monthly public lottery, with more slots and shorter waiting times for electric vehicles than gas-powered vehicles. Every gas-powered vehicle must also remain idle for one day weekly, determined by the last digit of the license plate.

== Loopholes ==
Agencies around Beijing opened to connect clients with license holders, from $15,650 for an electric car to $22,700 for a gas-powered car. Fake marriages allow individuals to register in their partner's name for $2,845 a year or $9,816 for 5 years. Others have obtained license plates from outside of Beijing for $250, rented license plates off of car dealerships, or bought used cars that come with license plates.

== Outcomes ==
As of 2018, the number of permitted annual vehicle registrations decreased from 240,000 to 100,000. Between 1998 and 2018, levels of pollution attributed to transportation have decreased significantly. However, the air quality in Beijing still fails to meet China's standards and exceeds the levels deemed safe to breathe as determined by the World Health Organization.
