= Disease surveillance in China =

Main public health surveillance activity in China

Surveillance for communicable diseases is the main public health surveillance activity in China. Currently, the disease surveillance system in China has three major components:

- National Disease Reporting System (NDRS): The system covers the entire population (1.3 billion persons) living in all the provinces, prefectures, and counties that make up mainland China. Thirty-five communicable diseases are reportable under this system.
- Nationwide Disease Surveillance Points (DSPs): This surveillance system, comprising 145 reporting sites selected by stratified cluster random sampling, covers a 1% representative sample of China's population.
- Surveillance system for specific infectious diseases, occupational diseases, food poisoning, etc.

There are 35 notifiable infectious diseases, which are divided into Classes A, B, and C. The functions of the surveillance include explaining the natural history of infectious diseases, describing the distribution of case occurrence, triggering disease-control effort, monitoring epidemic of infectious diseases during natural disasters, predicting and controlling epidemics, and providing the base of policy adjustment.

Data collected through the disease surveillance network serve as the basis for formulating health policies and devising strategies for preventing disease. A computerized reporting system for notifiable diseases has been established that links China's 30 provinces, autonomous regions, and municipalities. Mechanisms for providing timely feedback to units that report data and for systematically assessing the quality of those data are important attributes of this system.

== National Disease Reporting System (NDRS) ==
In 1959, a system for reporting infectious diseases was established. Data collected at the village level are reported to prevention units in township hospitals. From the prevention units, data are transmitted through county health and epidemic-prevention stations to provincial centers, and then on to the Chinese Academy of Preventive Medicine. Since 1977, the Ministry of Public Health has convened annual meetings to analyze these data on the morbidity and mortality associated with infectious diseases.

In 1987, a Nationwide Antiepidemic Computer Telecommunication Network (NATCN) was established as an official information system for the National Disease Reporting System (NDRS). The Ministry of Public Health and the provincial centers of health and epidemic prevention support this network, which monitors disease epidemics at various levels within the public health system. As technical facilities of the network improve, use of the NACTN will expand into all aspects of public health surveillance.

=== Computer Network Development ===
After receiving approval from the Ministry of Public Health in 1986, the Chinese Academy of Preventive Medicine (CAPM) began to establish a nationwide microcomputer communication network. The purpose was to link all the country's provincial centers of health and epidemic prevention in an effort to improve the system for preventing epidemics. After a year was spent establishing and modifying the system, a network that connected the capitals of 30 provinces, autonomous regions, and municipalities began operating in 1987. The primary function of the network was to collect data on the morbidity and mortality associated with reportable communicable diseases, to obtain information on outbreaks of other types of disease, and to provide monthly and annual reports to local and national health authorities.

=== Morbidity and Mortality Monthly Reports (MMMR) ===
Each month, all provinces transmit county-level summaries of the numbers of cases and deaths associated with 35 notifiable communicable diseases to the Academy of Preventive Medicine. Reports are sent on the 13th to 15th day of each month via the NACTN. At the central node of NACTN, the academy's Center of Computer Science and Health Statistics compiles and analyzes the data, provides feedback to the provinces, and creates national summaries within one week. Copies of the MMMR are distributed regularly to health authorities at various levels.

=== Morbidity and Mortality Annual Report (MMAR) ===
Each January, all provinces provide supplementary reports to revise and update the monthly reports submitted during the previous year. Age- and occupation-specific reports of mortality and morbidity are also submitted at this time. In April, after the surveillance data have been reviewed at the national meeting on epidemic diseases, the MMAR and other analytical reports are distributed.

=== Computer Telecommunication of Surveillance Data: Technical Issues ===
Until the 1980s, no public digital communications system was available in China. In establishing the nationwide communication network, modems with common analog telephone lines had to be used. Making this large communication system run successfully posed major challenges. With some of the problems in mind, the system was designed to have strong fault-tolerant redundancy - with the capability for self-correction - to overcome the myriad of problems caused by poor-quality telephone lines and cumbersome telephone exchange systems.

The NACTN was enhanced by incorporating the following functions.

- Breakpoint recording with resumption of operations: When telephone lines break during data transmission, the system is designed to record the break-point status for every case. This allows data transmission to resume automatically when line connections are reestablished.
- Automatic node scanning and re-circling: This feature allows the system to scan the status of all network nodes to allocate telephone lines and thereby optimize the strategy for maintaining line connections. This important mechanism improves the efficiency of the system and makes data transmission more successful.
- Automatic sorting/batching, rescheduling, and executing of transmissions: The system can execute all necessary network commands to carry out the communication task arranged by command files of the MMMR/MMAR system. The system adjusts the path as needed in order to complete transmissions that have been delayed because of problems in the system.
- Data compression and security: Before transmission, data are processed by a "two-phase compressing" procedure. Data file size can be compressed more than 90%, resulting in shorter online transmission times. Thus, receiving data from the 30 provincial reporting centers on the network requires only about an hour of online operation. Compression also makes data transmission more secure.

==== System Support for NACTN ====
- Personnel: In each province, the computer divisions have selected one or two persons who are dedicated to operating the province's nodes of the NACTN. In 1987, a working group convened to coordinate computer applications and activities. Several times each year, persons from provincial centers meet to discuss network problems and to devise solutions.
- Hardware and software: Special software has been developed: YQS for collecting and processing information and producing reports and TXS for managing network communications.

==== Future Developments of the NACTN ====
- Accumulating information
- Updating techniques
- Establishing subnetworks within provinces

In collaboration with the NACTN, a few provinces have established subnetworks to facilitate local communication.

==== Existing Databases ====
- National report on infectious disease
- National disease surveillance
- National report on occupational disease
- National report on outbreaks of food poisoning
- National survey data bases: Drinking water quality; Human-parasite infections; Nutritional surveys; Nutrition for the elderly; Child-nutrition surveillance; Diarrheal disease of children; Smoking and health.

== National Disease Surveillance Points (DSPs) ==
In the period 1980–1989, the network of DSPs covered 29 provinces, autonomous regions, and municipalities that had a combined population of 10 million persons (<1% of China's population). When the network was proposed in 1978, it was not possible to obtain a population-based random sample. Because participation in the network was voluntary, the data collected were biased, even after attempts were made to adjust the sample to improve national representativeness. Persons covered by the DSPs tended to be from the upper-middle socioeconomic stratum.

In 1989, efforts were begun to select a new sample of surveillance points. We used stratified cluster random sampling to select 145 DSPs in 30 provinces, autonomous regions, and municipalities, which have a combined population structure similar to that shown in the national census. Data on individual births and deaths, as well as on infectious diseases and certain types of behaviors (e.g., tobacco smoking), are recorded. At the household level, information on socioeconomic indicators, health-care conditions, and environmental factors is collected.

Information obtained from the DSPs is compared with data obtained from the National Disease Reporting System to enable policymakers to estimate more accurately the burden of morbidity and mortality associated with infectious disease. More importantly, policy makers can evaluate information from the DSPs in relation to the economic development, cultural background, and health-care-service use by the population covered by this surveillance system.

Data collected at DSPs:

- Household information: includes data on number of members, income, health-care situation, water supply, and toilet facilities.
- Individual information: includes data on occupation, education, births, deaths, episodes of infectious diseases, pregnancy, lactation, feeding, and vaccination status.

Each month, data collected by the township hospitals and village prevention units are submitted to the country, which then conveys the information through the provincial centers to the Chinese Academy of Preventive Medicine. The academy distributes monthly reports to the Ministry of Public Health, to provincial health authorities, and to all DSPs. An annual report is also published and distributed.

=== Surveys and Investigations ===
Surveys and investigations are conducted by the DSPs to improve the quality and promote the use of data collected. These surveys and investigations are designed to generate information that can be used by policymakers. At present, the following activities are being undertaken:

- Characterizing risk factors and patterns of death among adults;
- Identifying factors that influence the quality of data collected by DSPs;
- Developing methods to monitor Chronic diseases in China;
- Devising approaches to promote use of data from DSPs by policymakers.

=== Development of the Network of Disease Surveillance Points ===
Samples of persons already monitored under existing DSPs will be used for data collection to address important and emerging public health issues. Issues to be addressed include a prospective study of the health consequences of smoking, an assessment of drinking-water quality and disease occurrence, an evaluation of the national "Expanded Program on Immunization", and an epidemiologic study of hepatitis. By selecting samples in this fashion, investigators can correlate data from these special studies with data routinely collected under the system of DSPs.

== Surveillance of Specific Infectious diseases ==
The following are examples of surveillance for specific infectious diseases.

- For each 10-day period during the summer, cases of cholera - diagnosed by microbiologic or clinical criteria - from all the provinces, autonomous regions, and municipalities are reported to the national level; this information is compiled and conveyed back to the provincial reporting sources.
- In eight provinces, surveillance among subgroups of the population with elevated risk for infection with human immunodeficiency virus (HIV) is conducted at the national diagnostic laboratories by using immediate reports and confirmatory testing.
- A surveillance network for epidemic hemorrhagic fever has been established for immediate reporting of cases. During the peak season, surveillance for disease among rodents is conducted to provide an early-warning system at the local level.

== Quality control of data collection ==
Quality control (QC) in association with data collection (DC) has been an important component of disease-surveillance activities in China.

- In November of each year, the NDRS actively surveys hospitals and households to identify the proportion of notifiable diseases that went unreported. During a recent year, for example, the proportion of class A and B infectious diseases that was unreported was 27%; this proportion was used to correct the total annual estimate of morbidity attributable to infectious diseases.
- Disease Surveillance Points (DSPs) are surveyed annually to estimate underreporting of births, deaths, and morbidity due to infectious diseases. From 1990 to 1991, for example, reporting of morbidity from infectious diseases improved. The proportions of unreported births, age-specific deaths, and disease-specific deaths are also reported. In 1991, a team from the Chinese Academy of Preventive Medicine evaluated the quality of data reported from 18 DSPs located in nine provinces. In their study, the evaluation team identified factors that influenced data quality.

== Use of surveillance data for control of disease ==
Surveillance data have been used to implement and evaluate public health programs.

Monitoring morbidity from infectious disease during heavy flooding in 1991

When six provinces around the Yangtze River were heavily flooded in 1991, the central government expressed serious concern about disease-prevention activities in these provinces. In response, experts were dispatched to the flooded area, and prevention guidelines were developed and distributed to the affected provinces. Simultaneously, a system for collecting daily reports of disease activity was established. Every 3 days, DSP data on infectious disease morbidity were compared with data from previous years to identify potential outbreaks. For example, rates of hepatitis during the flood were compared with rates for the comparable time periods from the preceding 2 years. Data collected from June to October 1991 indicated that infectious diseases had been controlled effectively during the flood.

Forecasting the epidemiologic transition in China

In a study sponsored by the World Bank, data collected in DSPs in the period 1986-1989 have been used to study the epidemiologic transition in China. Mortality from leading causes of death was projected for 2010 and 2030. After risk factors were assessed and the impact of preventive programs on these chronic diseases was estimated, mortality rates were recalculated. These analyses were used to develop recommendations for program planning to the Ministry of Health.

Prediction and control of meningitis

After surveillance data on morbidity from meningitis in China were reviewed by empirical analysis and Boyer's Theorem, it was predicted that morbidity from this disease would peak in 1984 or 1985. Additional analyses suggested that the vaccination program that had been conducted for several years, which provided vaccination only for children <12 months of age, would not be adequate to control the predicted upsurge in disease. Therefore, a new vaccination program was adopted that expanded coverage to all children <5 years of age in areas in which surveillance data (including serum epidemiologic data) identified a high risk of meningitis outbreaks. The results in Henan Province suggested that the intensified vaccination coverage was successful in decreasing rates of meningitis.

Strategy for vaccination for poliomyelitis

After data from 1988 to 1989 on rates of poliomyelitis and vaccination coverage were reviewed, and high-risk areas were identified. In these areas, persons received supplementary vaccination in 1989–1990. By 1991, rates of poliomyelitis had begun to fall.
