= Course (medicine) =

Continual process or development

In medicine the term course generally takes one of two meanings, both reflecting the sense of "path that something or someone moves along...process or sequence or steps":

- A course of medication is a period of continual treatment with drugs, sometimes with variable dosage and in particular combinations. For instance treatment with some drugs should not end abruptly. Instead, their course should end with a tapering dosage.

- Antibiotics: Taking the full course of antibiotics is important to prevent reinfection and/or development of drug-resistant bacteria.

- Steroids: For both short-term and long-term steroid treatment, when stopping treatment, the dosage is tapered rather than abruptly ended. This permits the adrenal glands to resume the body's natural production of cortisol. Abrupt discontinuation can result in adrenal insufficiency; and/or steroid withdrawal syndrome (a rebound effect in which exaggerated symptoms return).

- The course of a disease, also called its natural history, is the development of the disease in a patient, including the sequence and speed of the stages and forms they take. Typical courses of diseases include:

- chronic
- recurrent or relapsing
- subacute: somewhere between an acute and a chronic course
- acute: beginning abruptly, intensifying rapidly, not lasting long
- fulminant or peracute: particularly acute, especially if unusually violent

A patient may be said to be at the beginning, the middle or the end, or at a particular stage of the course of a disease or a treatment. A precursor is a sign or event that precedes the course or a particular stage in the course of a disease, for example chills often are precursors to fevers.
