= Chronic disease in China =

Overview article

Chronic, non-communicable diseases account for an estimated 80% of total deaths and 70% of disability-adjusted life years (DALYs) lost in China. Cardiovascular diseases, chronic respiratory disease, and cancer are the leading causes of both death and of the burden of disease, and exposure to risk factors is high: more than 300 million men smoke cigarettes and 160 million adults are hypertensive, most of whom are not being treated. An obesity epidemic is imminent, with more than 20% of children aged 7–17 years in big cities now overweight or obese. Rates of death from chronic disease in middle-aged people are higher in China than in some high-income countries.

In China, as in many other parts of the world, the government has focused on communicable diseases—however, China now has a "double burden" of disease. The prevention of chronic diseases is now receiving a national response commensurate with the burden.

The national cancer prevention and control plan (2004–10) is being implemented, and a national chronic disease prevention and control plan has been completed (in late-2005). Progress has been made in some areas, with current smoking prevalence in men declining at about 1% per year for a decade, and even better results in large demonstration programs. Much remains to be done, and resources and sustainability are major issues. However, the surveillance and intervention mechanisms needed to ameliorate the increasing burden of chronic diseases are developing rapidly, taking account of the lessons learned over the past two decades.

It is said that about 25% of all cancer deaths globally - across planet Earth - are of Chinese persons in Mainland China and that one-fifth (20%) of all deaths inside China are from one or more cancers. ,

== Epidemiology ==
The ageing of the population is the major force driving the epidemic of chronic diseases. In 2000, 7% of the Chinese population were aged 65 years or older, and more than 400 million Chinese adults are now aged 20–39 years. If current trends continue, by 2040 the group aged 65 years and older will have increased to almost 20% of the population. The ageing of the population alone is predicted to produce a 200% increase in deaths from cardiovascular disease in China between the years 2000 and 2040.

In addition to the ageing of the population, China is experiencing dramatic transformations in many social and economic conditions that will continue to increase the incidence of major chronic diseases. For example, the country has recorded spectacular economic growth since 1978 and, on average, people's standard of living is far higher than ever before in the rapidly expanding urban areas. From 1990 to 2000, the proportion of people living in urban settings in China increased from 26% to 36%, the number of cities increased to 663, and the number of towns also soared. It is expected that urbanization in China will reach 45% by 2010, and 60% by 2030, with an extra 200 million more people expected in the urban areas before 2010. This growth comes at a cost in health terms. For example, a clear relation exists between urbanization and the prevalence of diabetes in China (diabetes defined as diabetic symptoms and a random blood glucose concentration of 11.1 mmol/L or more, a fasting blood glucose of 7.0 mmol/L or more, or an abnormal result of 2-h oral glucose tolerance test). Studies suggest that patients in China who were diagnosed with diabetes in middle age eventually lost an average nine years of life, and that risk of mortality was much higher than in Western populations.

The rapid environmental changes that follow urbanization are increasing the prevalence of the major risk factors for chronic disease. Tobacco use, unhealthy nutrition, and physical inactivity leading to obesity and hypertension are already common, and physical inactivity is increasing. The prevalence of current cigarette smoking in men (smoked in the past 30 days) was 57% in 2002, but had fallen from 63% in 1996; less than 3% of women are current smokers. This favorable trend must be continued, because lung cancer death rates are calculated to have more than doubled in men between 1991 and 1995, and are increasing at 2–5% per year in urban and rural working men aged 15–54 years. The decrease in smoking is the only encouraging risk factor trend, and is consistent with the plateau of tobacco consumption over this same period in the face of a rising adult population, as has occurred in other countries where tobacco taxes have been raised sharply. In 1999 the first Global Youth Tobacco Survey in China showed that 22% of students aged 13–15 years had ever tried to smoke; the current smoking rate was only 5%.

China's first comprehensive survey in the fields of nutrition and health was done in 2002. 71,971 households were chosen from 132 counties of 31 provinces, autonomous regions, and the municipalities, using the Central Government household census, and 243,479 people were included in the survey. The prevalence of hypertension (blood pressure 140/90 or higher) in people aged 18 years or older was 19%—a 30% increase since 1991. The prevalence of adult overweight (23%) and obesity (7%) had increased by 39% and 97%, respectively, over a 10-year period.

Of particular note is the rapidly developing epidemic of obesity in Chinese children. The overall prevalence rates of overweight plus obesity in 2000 among students in six sites (Beijing, Tianjin, and Shanghai cities and Hebei, Liaoning, and Shandong provinces) increased from 1–2% in 1985 to 25% for boys aged 7–9 years, 25% for boys aged 10–12 years, 17% for girls aged 7–9 years, and 14% for girls aged 10–12 years. In 2002, prevalence rates in children aged 7–17 years varied from 13% overweight and 8% obese in a range of big cities to 2% overweight and less than 1% obese in a range of rural sites.

=== Economic consequences ===
The economic consequences of chronic diseases for China are serious. For cardiovascular disease alone, Chinese people aged 35–64 years lost 6.7 million years of productive life during the year 2000 at a cost to the country of around US$30 billion. Only a quarter of this cost was estimated to be direct health-care costs. If current trends continue the total of years of productive life lost in this age range in China is estimated to increase to 10.5 million by 2030. It is estimated that in 2005 China will lose about $18 billion in national income from the effects of heart disease, stroke, and diabetes on labor supplies and savings. The cumulative loss over the period 2005–2015 would be about $556 billion.

== Progress in chronic disease prevention and control ==
The establishment of Chinese cancer registries began in 1963 in Shanghai, and data from registries led to some of the first programs that addressed chronic diseases in China. For example, mortality from cervical cancer in the Jing'an county of Jiangxi province decreased to 9.6 per 100 000 in 1985 from 42.0 per 100 000 in 1974, at least in part a result of the introduction of the "early detection, early diagnosis and early treatment" of cervical cancer (Kong L, unpublished). Cancer has led the way in chronic disease control initiatives. In 2003, the Ministry of Health of the People's Republic of China, which is responsible for health policy, completed a national cancer control plan on the basis of expert opinions in diverse fields. Some elements of the Program of Cancer Prevention and Control in China (2004–2010) are now being implemented, for example with rapid diagnosis and screening trials for cervical cancer.

Between 1991 and 2000, a community-based intervention trial on management of diabetes and hypertension was done in an urban population of 300,000 in three cities (Beijing, Shanghai, and Changsha). The most notable outcomes were that the incidence of stroke decreased by 52% in men and 53% in women, and the mortality rate of stroke fell by 54% overall.

In 1995, the World Bank Loan Health VII: China Disease Prevention Project—health promotion component (1996–2002) began in seven cities: Beijing, Tianjin, Shanghai, Chengdu, Luoyang, Liuzhou and Weihai, and some regions of Yunnan province. The program covered about 90 million people. To date, among the chronic diseases outcomes reported are an overall reduction of 15% in the prevalence of male adult cigarette smokers, and in Beijing substantial increases in hypertension detection and treatment with a fall in cardiovascular disease death rates of more than 15% in the last year of the project (Wu Z, Director, Beijing Institute of Heart, Lung and Blood Vessel Diseases, personal communication).

Based on the experience of this project, the Ministry of Health began establishing demonstration sites for chronic disease prevention and control nationwide in 1997. There are currently 32 community-based sites and the major activities include community diagnosis, community mobilization, development of integrated community interventions (smoking control, healthy diet, physical activity, hypertension prevention, mental health, prevention and control of cardiovascular disease, diabetes, cancer, chronic respiratory disease), training, and evaluations of interventions.

== Current policy activities ==
Risk factor patterns and demographic trends show that the most important priorities for chronic disease prevention in China are to control blood pressure in the 160 million hypertensive adults, and help more than 300 million adult male smokers to quit. Although no current data are available about smokers' intentions to quit (see Smoking cessation), the Health VII project achieved an overall quit rate of 25% in men over a 6-year period. Progress is also being made with the control of hypertension, and the mortality rate from cardiovascular disease halved in hypertensive patients over a 3-year period in the Shanghai demonstration sites (Kong L, unpublished).

China has just ratified the Framework Convention of Tobacco Control. During the past two decades, action has included: in-depth dissemination of tobacco control information and health education; the development of a series of tobacco control laws, regulations and rules; the formation of a tobacco control network; the organization of workshops and symposiums; the progressive limitation and banning of tobacco advertisements; mass campaigns on tobacco control; tobacco control in youth; and support for and participation in the negotiation of the WHO Framework Convention of Tobacco Control. The 2008 Olympics is to be smoke-free.

To improve the nutrition and health condition of the Chinese people, the government has been developing and promulgating a series of policies, and implementing many projects. A major focus is on primary schools, and demonstration projects are achieving encouraging reductions in the prevalence of childhood obesity. For example, in a project in four Chinese cities, the prevalence of obesity in grade 3 and 4 boys (aged 8–14 years) was reduced from 21% to 14% in 1 year (Tian B, National Health Education Institute, personal communication).

To meet the huge challenge of chronic diseases the Ministry of Health of China, with the support of WHO, and in cooperation with relevant sectors, has been developing the first medium and long-term high level national plan for chronic disease control and prevention (2005–15). This plan will mandate an integrated and comprehensive approach to the control and prevention of cardiovascular disease, cancer, chronic respiratory disease, and diabetes. There will be priority actions in at least four areas: adult male smoking, hypertension, overweight and obesity, and capacity building for chronic disease control.

== Surveillance and information systems ==
The National Center for Chronic and Non-communicable Disease Control and Prevention (NCNCD) was established in 2002, under the leadership of the Chinese Center for Disease Prevention and Control (CDC), which is the technical counterpart of the Ministry of Health. NCNCD is the institution for chronic disease prevention and control at the national level and is responsible for surveillance and population based interventions. A national chronic disease control network is being built. At present, almost all provincial-level CDCs have a specified chronic disease responsibility and mission with the development of personnel and financing. Prefecture-level CDCs have been established in most provinces, and CDC staff are being appointed at lower regional levels—e.g., in counties.

Comprehensive disease surveillance has been done in China through the National Disease Surveillance Points System, which was founded in 1978, primarily to report on communicable diseases, with some chronic disease responsibilities. The system was expanded and adjusted to improve its representativeness of China as a whole in 2004. The revised system includes 150 disease surveillance sites. Current initiatives of the system include upgrading cause of death registration so each disease surveillance point will function as a population mortality register for its designated site. The NCNCD is now responsible for the Disease Surveillance Points System, which is the major national resource for surveillance of chronic disease.

Following the framework of the WHO STEPs Surveillance system, the first National Risk Factor Surveillance Survey was done in August, 2004, with a sample size of 33,180 individuals from 942 villages or sub-communities, 314 towns or communities in 79 counties or districts in the Disease Surveillance Points System. The data was analyzed, and a complete report was published in late 2005. A national system of risk factor surveillance is being developed, in which regional risk factor surveys, carried out by trained provincial and regional CDC staff according to national standards, are an important component.

== Challenges ==
The most pressing problems in the prevention of chronic disease in China relate to tobacco use and high blood pressure. Although the current generation of adults is at relatively low risk of the diseases associated with obesity, the rapid growth of obesity in the next generation will affect Chinese morbidity and mortality in the second half of this century, unless action is taken. The social and economic consequences will be very serious if China fails to achieve control of these risk factors as soon as possible. Demonstration projects have shown that chronic disease risk factors can be controlled in China. The challenge for the national government is to scale up these interventions, and build capacity for effective national chronic disease control programs.
