= Chronic Illness (journal) =

Medical journal

- Discipline: Chronic illness
- Language: English
- Edited by: Christopher Dowrick

Publication details
- History: 2005–present
- Publisher: SAGE Publications
- Frequency: Quarterly

Standard abbreviations
- ISO 4: Chronic Illn.

Indexing
- ISSN: 1742-3953 (print); 1745-9206 (web)
- LCCN: 2006243055
- OCLC no.: 60821465

Links
- Journal homepage; Online access; Online archive

Chronic Illness is a quarterly peer-reviewed medical journal that covers research in the field of chronic illnesses. Its editor-in-chief is Christopher Dowrick (University of Liverpool). It was established in 2005 and is currently published by SAGE Publications.

== Abstracting and indexing ==
Chronic Illness is abstracted and indexed in:

- British Nursing Index
- EMBASE/Excerpta Medica
- EmCare
- SciVal
- Scopus
