= Centre for Rural and Northern Health Research =

The Centre for Rural and Northern Health Research or CRaNHR is a research centre jointly located at Laurentian University in Sudbury, Ontario and Lakehead University in Thunder Bay, Ontario. CRaNHR collaborates with the Northern Ontario School of Medicine in many research projects.

Established in 1992, CRaNHR conducts research on rural health with the goal to improve health services and access to health care primarily in rural and northern areas, and to better understand the health care system.

The research centre was formerly known as the Northern Health Human Resources Research Unit (NHHRRU). In 1997, it adopted its current name.
