= Disease surveillance =

Monitoring spread of disease to establish patterns of progression

Disease surveillance is an epidemiological practice by which the spread of disease is monitored in order to establish patterns of progression. The main role of disease surveillance is to predict, observe, and minimize the harm caused by outbreak, epidemic, and pandemic situations, as well as increase knowledge about which factors contribute to such circumstances. A key part of modern disease surveillance is the practice of disease case reporting.

The number of cases could be gathered from hospitals – which would be expected to see most of the occurrences – collated, and eventually made public. With the advent of modern communication technology, this has changed dramatically. Organizations like the World Health Organization (WHO) and the Centers for Disease Control and Prevention (CDC) now can report cases and deaths from significant diseases within days – sometimes within hours – of the occurrence. Further, there is considerable public pressure to make this information available quickly and accurately.

== Mandatory reporting ==
Formal reporting of notifiable infectious diseases is a requirement placed upon health care providers by many regional and national governments, and upon national governments by the World Health Organization to monitor spread as a result of the transmission of infectious agents. Since 1969, WHO has required that all cases of the following diseases be reported to the organization: cholera, plague, yellow fever, smallpox, relapsing fever and typhus. In 2005, the list was extended to include polio and SARS. Regional and national governments typically monitor a larger set of (around 80 in the U.S.) communicable diseases that can potentially threaten the general population. Tuberculosis, HIV, botulism, hantavirus, anthrax, and rabies are examples of such diseases. The incidence counts of diseases are often used as health indicators to describe the overall health of a population.

== World Health Organization ==
The World Health Organization (WHO) is the lead agency for coordinating global response to major diseases. The WHO maintains Websites for a number of diseases and has active teams in many countries where these diseases occur.

During the SARS outbreak in early 2004, for example, the Beijing staff of the WHO produced updates every few days for the duration of the outbreak. Beginning in January 2004, the WHO has produced similar updates for H5N1. These results are widely reported and closely watched.

WHO's Epidemic and Pandemic Alert and Response (EPR) to detect, verify rapidly and respond appropriately to epidemic-prone and emerging disease threats covers the following diseases:

- Anthrax
- Avian influenza
- Crimean–Congo hemorrhagic fever
- Dengue hemorrhagic fever
- Ebola virus disease
- Hepatitis
- Influenza
- Lassa fever
- Marburg hemorrhagic fever
- Meningococcal disease
- Plague
- Rift Valley fever
- Severe acute respiratory syndrome (SARS)
- Severe acute respiratory syndrome coronavirus 2 (SARS-CoV-2)
- Smallpox
- Tularemia
- Yellow fever

== Political challenges ==
As the lead organization in global public health, the WHO occupies a delicate role in global politics. It must maintain good relationships with each of the many countries in which it is active. As a result, it may only report results within a particular country with the agreement of the country's government. Because some governments regard the release of any information on disease outbreaks as a state secret, this can place the WHO in a difficult position.

The WHO coordinated International Outbreak Alert and Response is designed to ensure "outbreaks of potential international importance are rapidly verified and information is quickly shared within the Network" but not necessarily by the public; integrate and coordinate "activities to support national efforts" rather than challenge national authority within that nation in order to "respect the independence and objectivity of all partners". The commitment that "All Network responses will proceed with full respect for ethical standards, human rights, national and local laws, cultural sensitivities and tradition" ensures each nation that its security, financial, and other interests will be given full weight.

== Technical challenges ==
Testing for a disease can be expensive, and distinguishing between two diseases can be prohibitively difficult in many countries. One standard means of determining if a person has had a particular disease is to test for the presence of antibodies that are particular to this disease. In the case of H5N1, for example, there is a low pathogenic H5N1 strain in wild birds in North America that a human could conceivably have antibodies against. It would be extremely difficult to distinguish between antibodies produced by this strain, and antibodies produced by Asian lineage HPAI A(H5N1). Similar difficulties are common, and make it difficult to determine how widely a disease may have spread.

There is currently little available data on the spread of H5N1 in wild birds in Africa and Asia. Without such data, predicting how the disease might spread in the future is difficult. Information that scientists and decision makers need to make useful medical products and informed decisions for health care, but currently lack include:

- Surveillance of wild bird populations
- Cell cultures of particular strains of diseases

== H5N1 ==
Surveillance of H5N1 in humans, poultry, wild birds, cats and other animals remains very weak in many parts of Asia and Africa. Much remains unknown about the exact extent of its spread.

H5N1 in China is less than fully reported. Blogs have described many discrepancies between official China government announcements concerning H5N1 and what people in China see with their own eyes. Many reports of total H5N1 cases have excluded China due to widespread disbelief in China's official numbers. (See Disease surveillance in China.)

"Only half the world's human bird flu cases are being reported to the World Health Organization within two weeks of being detected, a response time that must be improved to avert a pandemic, a senior WHO official said Saturday. Shigeru Omi, WHO's regional director for the Western Pacific, said it is estimated that countries would have only two to three weeks to stamp out, or at least slow, a pandemic flu strain after it began spreading in humans."

David Nabarro, chief avian flu coordinator for the United Nations, says avian flu has too many unanswered questions.

CIDRAP reported on 25 August 2006 on a new US government Website that allows the public to view current information about testing of wild birds for H5N1 avian influenza, which is part of a national wild-bird surveillance plan that "includes five strategies for early detection of highly pathogenic avian influenza. Sample numbers from three of these will be available on HEDDS: live wild birds, subsistence hunter-killed birds, and investigations of sick and dead wild birds. The other two strategies involve domestic bird testing and environmental sampling of water and wild-bird droppings. [...] A map on the new USGS site shows that, 9327 birds from Alaska have been tested so far this year, with only a few from most other states. Last year, officials tested just 721 birds from Alaska and none from most other states, another map shows. The goal of the surveillance program for 2006 is to collect 75000 to 100000 samples from wild birds and 50000 environmental samples, officials have said".

== See also ==
- 1985 World Health Organization AIDS surveillance case definition
- AIDS-defining clinical condition – CDC list of diseases associated with AIDS
- Bioterrorism#Biosurveillance – Terrorism involving biological agents
- Disease surveillance in China – Main public health surveillance activity in China
- Public health surveillance – Collection, analysis and interpretation of health-related data
- Predictive analytics – Statistical techniques analyzing facts to make predictions about unknown events
- Pandemic prevention – Organization and management of preventive measures against pandemics
- Contact tracing – Finding and identifying people in contact with someone with an infectious disease
- Council of State and Territorial Epidemiologists
- Early Warning and Response System (EWRS) – European communicable disease communication system
- Global Infectious Disease Epidemiology Network (GIDEON) – Medical decision support system (GIDEON)
- Infection control – Medical discipline for preventing nosocomial or healthcare-associated infection
- List of notifiable diseases
- STD testing – Infection transmitted through human sexual behavior
- UK statutory notification system – Infectious disease notification system in the UK
