= NOSM University =

Public university in Ontario, Canada

Coordinates: 46.46388°N 80.96546°W

Northern Ontario School of Medicine University
- Former name: Northern Ontario School of Medicine
- Motto: Innovative Education and Research for a Healthier North
- Type: Medical school
- Established: April 1, 2002; 24 years ago
- Chancellor: Cindy Blackstock
- President: Michael Green
- Academic staff: 350
- Administrative staff: 250
- Students: 224
- Location: Sudbury and Thunder Bay, Ontario, Canada
- Website: www.nosm.ca

Northern Ontario School of Medicine University (NOSM University; French: Université de l'École de médecine du Nord de l'Ontario, Université ÉMNO) is a public university in the Canadian province of Ontario. It is mandated both to educate doctors and other learners as well as being socially accountable to Northern Ontario's urban, rural and remote communities. It has campuses in both Sudbury and Thunder Bay.

The Northern Ontario School of Medicine was created as a partnership between Laurentian University in Sudbury and Lakehead University in Thunder Bay, before being made a standalone university in April 2022.

Emblem of NOSM prior to university status.

In 2021, following the 2021 Laurentian University financial crisis, the provincial government announced NOSM would become an independent University which would retain collaborative relationships with both Laurentian and Lakehead but would be funded directly by the provincial government as a standalone university.

== History ==
Before the creation of NOSM, Northern Ontario had for several years been designated as "underserviced", meaning that the region's ratio of medical professionals to the general population was not meeting the standards set by the Ministry of Health. As a result, a multifaceted plan was adopted by the province, including the creation of NOSM and the adoption of special recruitment strategies. A study of medical services in Ontario, released in August 2005, found that for the first time in many years, the region's level of medical services had improved over the previous year.

Construction on both campuses began in mid-2004, and the buildings were completed in August 2005. NOSM accepted its charter class of 56 students in September of that same year and the school was officially opened by Premier Dalton McGuinty on 13 September 2005. The school received full accreditation from the Committee on Accreditation of Canadian Medical Schools (CACMS) and the Liaison Committee on Medical Education (LCME) in February 2009.

The fictional Boréal Medical School, the setting of the Canadian medical drama television series Hard Rock Medical, is based on the Northern Ontario School of Medicine.

== Admissions ==
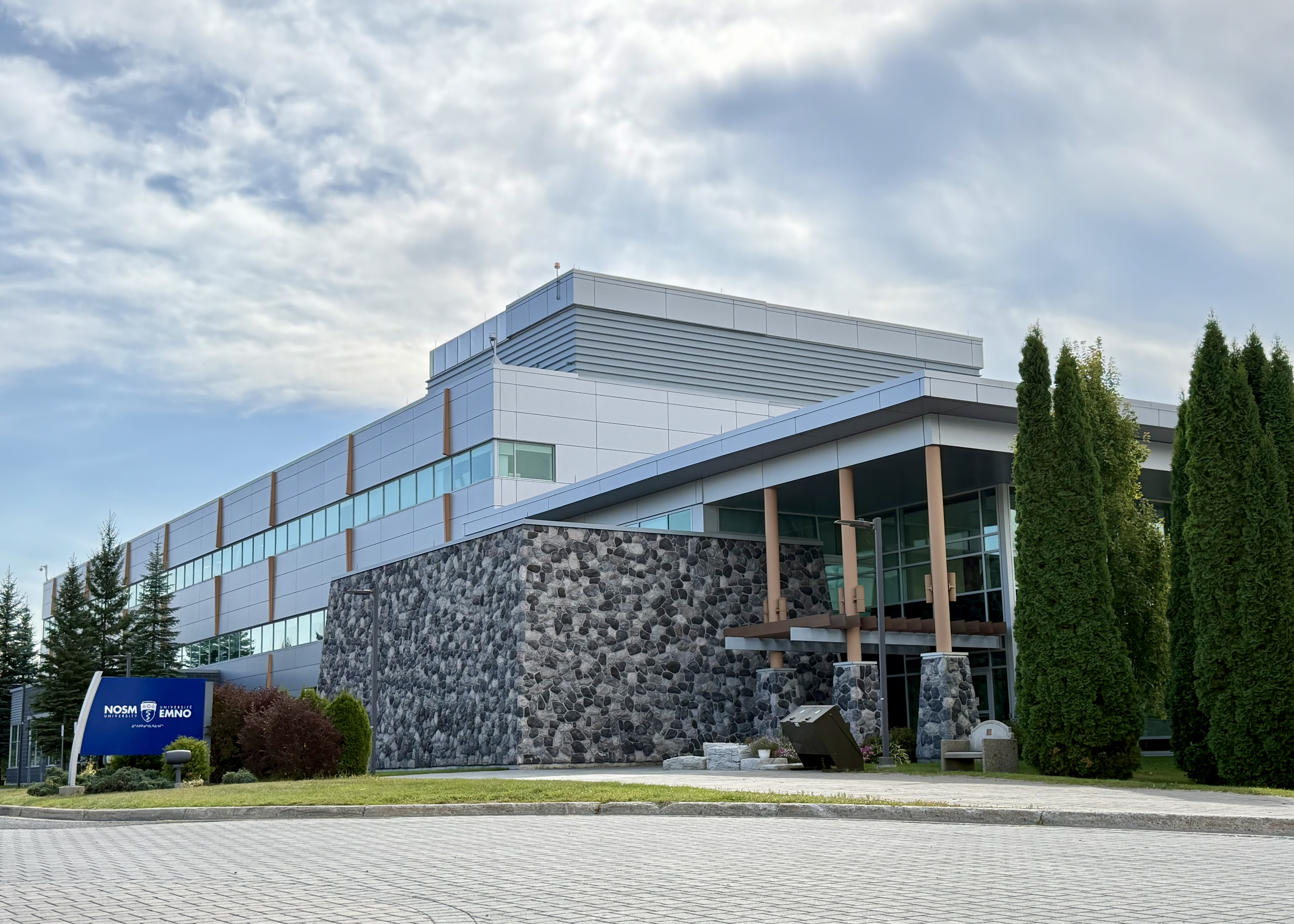
The Northern Ontario School of Medicine's East Campus in Sudbury, Ontario

The Northern Ontario School of Medicine is one of only two medical schools in Canada outside of Quebec (along with University of Ottawa) that does not require an MCAT score to be considered for admission. Furthermore, the only academic prerequisite is a university undergraduate degree with a minimum GPA of 3.0 out of 4.0 (the mean GPA of the 2013/2014 entering class was 3.83). To help further its social accountability mandate, NOSM does take into account where candidates are from and whether they have studied or worked in Northern Ontario or other rural or remote places. For each entering class since the schools inception in 2005, approximately 90-95% were from Northern Ontario. Each year, approximately 2000 applicants compete for the 64 spots in each class (36 at the Sudbury campus and 28 at the Thunder Bay campus). Applicants request their preferred campus at the time of their interview.

== Hospitals ==
Fully affiliated teaching hospitals:

- Health Sciences North – Sudbury
- Thunder Bay Regional Health Sciences Centre – Thunder Bay

Larger community teaching hospitals:

- South Muskoka Memorial Hospital – Bracebridge
- LaVerendrye Hospital – Fort Frances
- Huntsville District Memorial Hospital – Huntsville
- Sensenbrenner Hospital - Kapuskasing
- Lake of the Woods District Hospital – Kenora
- Temiskaming Hospital – New Liskeard
- North Bay General Hospital – North Bay
- West Parry Sound Health Centre – Parry Sound
- Sault Area Hospital – Sault Ste. Marie
- Sioux Lookout Meno Ya Win Health Centre – Sioux Lookout
- Timmins and District Hospital – Timmins

== See also ==
- Centre for Rural and Northern Health Research
