= NeuroAiD =

Supposed post-stroke ameliorative supplement

NeuroAiD is a herbal supplement proposed to support functional recovery after strokes. A 2016 systematic review found that MLC601 showed no benefit in outcomes at 3 months in acute ischemic stroke. It can be given by mouth or through a feeding tube.

There have been two formulations: MLC601 (NeuroAiDTM) was first developed. Since 2018 MLC601 formulation is no longer on the market, and has been replaced by MLC901 (NeuroAiDTMII), which contains 9 botanical ingredients.

It was first registered and marketed in China in 2001. It is derived from traditional Chinese medicine.

== Effectiveness ==
Neuroaid is no better than placebo in improving stroke recovery at 3 months post-stroke.

== Side effects ==
Common side effects include abdominal discomfort, headaches, dry mouth, nausea, vomiting, and diarrhea. Frequently, they can be relieved by reducing the dosage of the medication by 50% for a week. Once the symptoms have resolved, the usual dosage can be resumed. In some rare cases during clinical trials, a few patients experienced serious side effects (jaundice, low potassium levels, recurring strokes).

=== Contraindications ===
The medication is contraindicated in pregnant and breastfeeding women.

== Pharmacology ==
Laboratory studies suggest that NeuroAiD can aid with stroke recovery by improving neuroprotection, neurogenesis, and neuroplasticity by amplifying endogenous processes of self-protection and self-repair of the brain. MLC901 can activate KATP channels, which has a neuroprotective effect against brain ischemia.

=== Composition ===
NeuroAiD I, or MLC601, is composed of nine herbal components (astragalus root, Salvia miltiorrhiza root, chishao, rhizome lovage, Angelica sinensis root, safflower, peach, thinleaf milkwort root, and grassleaf sweet flag rhizome) and five components derived from animals (Hirudo medicinalis, Eupolyphaga seu steleophaga, Calculus bovis artifactus, Buthus martensii, and Cornu saigae tataricae). NeuroAiDTMII, or MLC901, is a form of the medication that contains nine herbal components without the animal components. Since 2018, MLC601 formulation is no longer marketed.

== Society and culture ==
According to the manufacturer, Moleac, it is sold in at least 25 countries, and 20,000 people have taken it.

=== Approvals ===
NeuroAiD was approved by the Sino Food and Drug Administration in August 2001, under the name Danqi Piantan Jiaonang. It has also been approved for use in Singapore. In 2006, it was chosen for the Chinese Ministry of Science and Technology's Key Technologies Research & Development program.

=== CHIMES Society ===
The manufacturer of NeuroAiD was a funder of the CHIMES Society which than funded research in this area.
