= Dynamic treatment regime =

In medical research, a dynamic treatment regime (DTR), adaptive intervention, or adaptive treatment strategy is a set of rules for choosing effective treatments for individual patients. Historically, medical research and the practice of medicine tended to rely on an acute care model for the treatment of all medical problems, including chronic illness. Treatment choices made for a particular patient under a dynamic regime are based on that individual's characteristics and history, with the goal of optimizing his or her long-term clinical outcome. A dynamic treatment regime is analogous to a policy in the field of reinforcement learning, and analogous to a controller in control theory. While most work on dynamic treatment regimes has been done in the context of medicine, the same ideas apply to time-varying policies in other fields, such as education, marketing, and economics.

== See also ==
- Personalized medicine
- Reinforcement learning
- Q learning
- Optimal control
- Multi-armed bandit
