= Standard of living in China =

Historically, the Chinese economy was characterized by widespread poverty, extreme income inequalities, and endemic insecurity of livelihood. Improvements since then saw the average national life expectancy rise from around forty-four years in 1949 to sixty-eight years in 1985, while the Chinese population estimated to be living in absolute poverty fell from between 200 and 590 million in 1978 to 70 million in 2017. Before the 19th century, China was one of the leading global powers.

Until the end of the 1970s, the fruits of economic growth were largely negated by population increases, which prevented significant advances in the per capita availability of food, clothing, and housing beyond levels achieved in the 1950s.

== History ==
In 1978, the Chinese Communist Party, under the leadership of Deng Xiaoping, began to introduce market reforms, including decollectivizing agriculture, allowing foreign investment and individual entrepreneurship. After thirty years of austerity and marginal sufficiency, Chinese consumers suddenly were able to buy more than enough to eat from a growing variety of food items. Stylish clothing, modern furniture, and a wide array of electrical appliances also became part of the normal expectations of ordinary Chinese families.

Following the economic reforms introduced by the government in the late 1970s, consumption, and individual incomes rose significantly, with the real per capita consumption of peasants rising at an annual rate of 6.7% from 1975 to 1986, while for urbanites over the same period, the corresponding figure was 5.5%. The improvements in the standard of living were demonstrated by a boom in rural and urban housing, together with a considerable increase in the ownership of televisions and other appliances.

== Food ==
While food production rose substantially after 1949, population increases were nearly as great until the 1980s. Production of grain, the source of about 75 percent of the calories in the Chinese diet, grew at an average rate of 2.7 percent a year between 1952 and 1979, while population growth averaged almost 2 percent a year. Total grain output per capita grew from 288 kilograms a year in 1952 to 319 kilograms in 1978, an increase of only 11 percent in 26 years. As of 1986, grain output was 369 kilograms per capita.

== Clothing ==
In the 1970s before the reform period, clothing purchases were restricted by rationing. Cotton cloth consumption was limited to between four and six meters a year per person. In the 1980s one of the most visible signs of the economic "revolution" was the appearance in Chinese cities of large quantities of relatively modern, varied, colorful clothes, a sharp contrast to the monotone image of blue and gray suits that typified Chinese dress in earlier years. Cloth consumption increased from eight meters per person in 1978 to almost twelve meters in 1985, and rationing was ended in the early 1980s. Production of synthetic fibers more than tripled during this period; in 1985 synthetics constituted 40 percent of the cloth purchased. Consumers also tripled their purchases of woolen fabrics in these years and bought growing numbers of garments made of silk, leather, or down. In 1987 Chinese department stores and street markets carried clothing in a large variety of styles, colors, quality, and prices. Many people displayed their new affluence with relatively expensive and stylish clothes, while those with more modest tastes or meager incomes still could adequately outfit themselves at very low cost.

== Consumer goods ==
As with food supplies and clothing, the availability of housewares went through several stages. Simple, inexpensive household items, like thermoses, cooking pans, and clocks were stocked in department stores and other retail outlets all over China from the 1950s on. Relatively expensive consumer durables became available more gradually. In the 1960s production and sales of bicycles, sewing machines, wristwatches, and transistor radios grew to the point that these items became common household possessions, followed in the late 1970s by television sets and cameras. In the 1980s supplies of furniture and electrical appliances increased along with family incomes. Household survey data indicated that by 1985 most urban families owned two bicycles, at least one sofa, a writing desk, a wardrobe, a sewing machine, an electric fan, a radio, and a television. Virtually all urban adults owned wristwatches, half of all families had washing machines, 10 percent had refrigerators, and over 18 percent owned color televisions. Rural households on average owned about half the number of consumer durables owned by urban dwellers. Most farm families had 1 bicycle, about half had a radio, 43 percent owned a sewing machine, 12 percent had a television set, and about half the rural adults owned wristwatches.

== Housing ==
Housing construction lagged behind urban population growth. A 1978 survey of housing conditions in 192 cities found that their combined population had increased by 83 percent between 1949 and 1978, but housing floor space had only grown by 46.7 percent. In 1978 there were only 3.6 square meters of living space per inhabitant in these cities, a reduction of 0.9 square meters since 1949. To remedy this problem, construction of modern urban housing became a top priority in the late 1970s, and by the mid-1980s new high-rise apartment blocks and the tall cranes used in their construction were ubiquitous features of large cities. Some apartments in the new buildings had their own lavatories, kitchens, and balconies, but others shared communal facilities. Nearly all were of much higher quality than older houses, many of which were built of mud bricks and lacked plumbing.

Housing conditions in rural areas varied widely. During the 1960s and 1970s, thousands of production brigades built sturdy, sanitary houses and apartments and in many cases entire new villages. With the introduction of the responsibility system and the more than doubling of rural incomes in the early 1980s, another wave of housing construction took place as farm families moved quickly to invest in their major personal assets – their homes – which for the most part were privately owned. Many farm family houses lacked running water, but virtually all had electricity and were considerably more spacious than urban dwellings. In 1980 farm homes averaged 9.4 square meters of living space per person, and by 1985 the figure had risen to 14.7 square meters. Despite extensive construction of new housing, in poorer regions some farm families still lived in traditional dwellings, such as mud-brick and thatch houses or, in some regions, cave houses. Many of the nomadic herders in Inner Mongolia, Xinjiang, and Tibet Autonomous Region still lived in tents or felt yurts. In the Yangtze River Valley and in south China, some fishing and boat transportation communities continued to live on their vessels.

Since the 1990s there has been an increasing number of apartments built in China which remain empty. In 2010 approximately 65 million apartments, capable of housing some 250 million people, were unoccupied, due to their being too expensive for the majority of Chinese to purchase or rent. At the same time, many millions of urban Chinese remained living in slums. But, as the urbanization rate in China remains high (approx. 20 million Chinese moves from rural areas each year) this problem is not severe and many so-called "ghost cities" become inhabited. As of 2012, there is 35 sq. meters per person on average and the construction rate exceeds 1.5 sq. meters per year which allow the total living area to exceed 50 sq. meters per capital as soon as in the year 2020.

== Income distribution ==
Income differences in China since the 1950s have been much smaller than in most other countries. There was never any attempt, however, at complete equalization, and a wide range of income levels remained. Income differences grew even wider in the 1980s as the economic reform policies opened up new income opportunities. More than two-thirds of all urban workers were employed in state-owned units, which used an eight-grade wage system. The pay for each grade differed from one industry to another, but generally workers in the most senior grades earned about three times as much as beginning workers, senior managers could earn half again as much as senior workers, and engineers could earn twice as much as senior workers. In 1985 the average annual income of people employed in state-owned units was ¥1,213. An important component of workers' pay was made up of bonuses and subsidies. In 1985 bonuses contributed 13 percent of the incomes of workers in state-owned units; subsidies for transportation, food, and clothing added another 15 percent. One of the most important subsidies – one that did not appear in the income figures – was for housing, nearly all of which was owned and allocated by the work unit and rented to unit members at prices well below real value. In 1985 urban consumers spent just over 1 percent of their incomes on housing.

The Chinese Customer Report 2010 states three groups of spending tiers of income: big spenders (who spend 21% of their income), medium spenders (who spend 36% of their income), and small spenders (who spend 43% of their income).

The 27 percent of the urban labor force that was employed in collectively owned enterprises earned less on average than workers in state-owned units. The income of workers in collectively owned enterprises consisted of a share of the profit earned by the enterprise. Most such enterprises were small, had little capital, and did not earn large profits. Many were engaged in traditional services, handicrafts, or small-scale, part-time assembly work. In 1985 workers in urban collective units earned an average annual income of ¥968. In the more open commercial environment of the 1980s, a small but significant number of people earned incomes much larger than those in regular state-owned and collectively owned units. Employees of enterprises run by overseas Chinese, for instance, earned an average of ¥2,437 in 1985, over twice the average income of workers in state-owned units.

The small but dynamic domestic private sector also produced some lucrative opportunities. Private, part-time schools, which appeared in large numbers in the mid-1980s, offered moonlighting work to university professors, who could double or triple their modest incomes if they were from prestigious institutions and taught desirable subjects, such as English, Japanese, or electronics. Small-scale entrepreneurs could earn considerably more in the free markets than the average income. Business people who served as a liaison between foreign firms and the domestic economy could earn incomes many times higher than those of the best-paid employees of state-owned units. A handful of millionaire businessmen could be found in the biggest cities. These people had owned firms before 1949, cooperated with the government in the 1950s in return for stock in their firms, and then lost their incomes in the political turmoil of the Cultural Revolution. In the late 1970s and early 1980s, when these businessmen were politically rehabilitated, their incomes were returned with the accrued interest, and some suddenly found themselves quite wealthy. Although the number of people earning incomes far beyond the normal wage scale was tiny relative to the population, they were important symbols of the rewards of economic reform and received a great deal of media attention. In 1985 most of these people worked in enterprises classified as "units of other ownership" (private rather than state- or collectively owned enterprises). These enterprises employed only 440,000 people out of the total urban labor force of 128 million in 1985 and paid average annual salaries of ¥1,373, only slightly higher than the overall urban national average.

In China, as in other countries, an important determinant of the affluence of a household was the dependency ratio – the number of nonworkers supported by each worker. In 1985 the average cost of living for one person in urban areas was ¥732 a year, and the average state enterprise worker, even with a food allowance and other benefits added to the basic wage, had difficulty supporting one other person. Two average wage earners, however, could easily support one dependent. Families with several workers and few or no dependents had substantial surplus earnings, which they saved or used to buy nonessential goods. An important positive influence on the per capita consumption levels of urban families was a decline in the number of dependents per urban worker, from 2.4 in 1964 to 0.7 in 1985. In farm families the dependency ratio fell from 1.5 in 1978 to 0.7 in 1985. Farm incomes rose rapidly in the 1980s under the stimulus of the responsibility system but on average remained considerably lower than urban incomes. Household surveys found that in 1985 average net per capita income for rural residents was ¥398, less than half the average per capita urban income, which was ¥821. The value of goods farmers produced and consumed themselves accounted for 31 percent of rural income in 1985. The largest component of income in kind was food, 58 percent of which was self-produced.

Farm family members on average consumed much less of most major kinds of goods than urban residents. For instance, a household survey found in 1985 that the average urban dweller consumed 148 kilograms of vegetables, 20 kilograms of meat, 2.6 kilograms of sugar, and 8 kilograms of liquor. At the same time, a survey of rural households found that the average rural resident consumed 131 kilograms of vegetables, 11 kilograms of meat, 1.5 kilograms of sugar, and 4 kilograms of liquor. Differences of a similar nature existed for consumer durables.

Another indication of the gap between urban and rural income levels was the difference in personal savings accounts, which in 1985 averaged ¥277 per capita for urban residents but only ¥85 per capita for the rural population. There was great variation in rural income levels among different provincial-level units, counties, towns, villages, and individual families. While the average net per capita income for rural residents in 1985 was ¥398, provincial-level averages ranged from a high of ¥805 for farm families living in Shanghai to a low of ¥255 for the rural population of Gansu.

The fundamental influence on rural prosperity was geography. Soil type and quality, rainfall, temperature range, drainage, and availability of water determined the kinds and quantities of crops that could be grown. Equally important geographic factors were access to transportation routes and proximity to urban areas.

The highest agricultural incomes were earned by suburban units that were able to sell produce and sideline products in the nearby cities. Under the responsibility system, household incomes depended on the number of workers in each household and the household's success in holding down production costs and in supplying goods and services to local markets. Most of the rural families with the highest incomes – the "10,000-yuan households" – were "specialized households" that concentrated family efforts on supplying a particular service or good. Many of these families owned their own equipment, such as trucks or specialized buildings, and operated essentially as private concerns. An increasingly important influence on rural incomes in the mid-1980s was the expansion of nonagricultural rural enterprises, often referred to as "township enterprises." These were factories, construction teams, and processing operations, most of which were owned by collectives, primarily villages, towns, and townships. Some were owned by voluntary groups of families. Township enterprises were considered by the government to be the main source of employment for rural workers who were leaving agriculture because of rising productivity under the responsibility system. By the end of 1986, township enterprises employed 21 percent of the rural labor force. The movement of rural labor into township enterprises helped to increase average rural incomes because of the higher productivity in nonagricultural jobs. In 1986 industrial workers in rural areas produced an average annual value of ¥4,300 per person, compared with about ¥1,000 per farmer in the same year.

The change in farm production from primarily collective to primarily household operations is reflected in household survey data on the sources of rural incomes. Before the 1980s farmers received income in the form of shares of the profits earned by their production teams plus supplementary income from household sideline activities. In 1978 two-thirds of the net income of farm families came from the collective, and only 27 percent was derived from household production. With the shift to the responsibility system these ratios were reversed. By 1982 the collective provided only 21 percent of farm income, while household production provided 69 percent. In 1985 the collective share of farm income had fallen to just over 8 percent, and the family production share had risen to 81 percent.

Perhaps the most serious gaps in living standards between rural and urban areas were in education and health care. Primary schools existed in most rural localities, and 80 percent of the country's primary-school teachers worked in rural schools. Secondary schools were less widely distributed; only 57 percent of the total number of secondary-school teachers served in rural schools. Most rural schools were less well equipped, and their staffs less adequately trained than their urban counterparts. Health care had been greatly improved in rural areas in the 1960s and 1970s through sanitation campaigns and the introduction of large numbers of barefoot doctors, midwives, and health workers. Most modern hospitals, fully trained doctors, and modern medical equipment, however, were located in urban areas and were not easily accessible to rural families. In 1985 two-thirds of all hospital beds and medical staff personnel were located in urban hospitals. The economic reforms affected rural education and health care positively in places where farm communities used their higher incomes to improve schools and hospitals and negatively in localities where the reduced role of the collective resulted in deterioration of collective services.

== See also ==
- Economy of China
- Economic history of China (1949–present)
- Reform and opening up
