= Health 21 =

Health 21 or Health21 is the name given to the World Health Organization (WHO) European Region policy framework derived from the "health-for-all policy for the twenty-first century" passed by the World Health Assembly in 1998. The framework was called "Health 21" not only because it dealt with health in the 21st century, but also because it laid out 21 "targets" for improving the health of Europeans.

== Targets ==
The Health 21 targets were:

1. "Solidarity for health in the European Region," or "closing the health gap between countries"
2. "Equity in health," or "closing the health gap within countries"
3. "Healthy start in life," for example "policies should... create a supportive family, with wanted children and good parenthood capacity"
4. "Health of young people," that is, "young people in the region should be healthier and better able to fulfil their roles in society"
5. "Healthy aging" as reflected in increases in life expectancy, disability-free life expectancy, and the proportion of older people who are healthy and at home
6. "Improving mental health"
7. "Reducing communicable diseases"
8. "Reducing non-communicable diseases"
9. "Reducing injury from violence and accidents"
10. "A healthy and safe physical environment"
11. "Healthier living" such as "healthier behaviour in such fields as nutrition, physical activity and sexuality" and "increase in the availability, affordability and accessibility of safe and healthy food"
12. "Reducing harm from alcohol, drugs and tobacco"
13. "Settings for health," specifically, "people in the region should have greater opportunities to live in healthy physical and social environments at home, at school, at the workplace and in the local community"
14. "Multisectoral responsibility for health"
15. "An integrated health sector" with "better access to family- and community-oriented primary health care, supported by a flexible and responsive hospital system"
16. "Managing for quality of care" by focusing on outcomes
17. "Funding health services and allocating resources," calling for "sustainable financing and resource allocation mechanisms for health care systems based on the principles of equal access, cost–effectiveness, solidarity, and optimum quality"
18. "Developing human resources for health" to ensure that health professionals and others "have acquired appropriate knowledge, attitudes and skills to protect and promote health"
19. "Research and knowledge for health": "health research, information and communication systems" should "better support the acquisition, effective utilization, and dissemination of knowledge"
20. "Mobilizing partners for health," including governments, professionals, nongovernmental organizations, the private sector, and individual citizens
21. "Policies and strategies for health for all" at "country, regional and local levels"

== See also ==
- Health policy
- Health promotion
  - Ottawa Charter for Health Promotion
  - Bangkok Charter
  - Jakarta Declaration
- Primary health care
  - Health for all
  - Alma Ata Declaration
- Public health
  - Healthy city
