= Health in All Policies =

Collaboration to achieve common goals

Health in All Policies (HiAP) was a term first used in Europe during the Finnish presidency of the European Union (EU), in 2006, with the aim of collaborating across sectors to achieve common goals. It is a strategy to include health considerations in policy making across different sectors that influence health, such as transportation, agriculture, land use, housing, public safety, and education. It reaffirms public health's essential role in addressing policy and structural factors affecting health, as articulated by the Ten Essential Public Health Services, and it has been promoted as an opportunity for the public health sector to engage a broader array of partners.

== Overview ==
The 1978 World Health Organization (WHO) declaration at Alma-Ata was the first formal acknowledgment of the importance of intersectoral action for health. The spirit of Alma-Ata was carried forward in the Ottawa Charter for Health Promotion (adopted in Ottawa in 1986), which discussed "healthy public policies" as a key area for health promotion.

HiAP is built on the rationale that health is determined by multiple factors outside the direct control of the health care sector, such as education, income, and the conditions in which people live, work, and play. Decisions made in other sectors can positively or negatively affect the determinants of health. HiAP is an approach to policy making in which decision-makers in other sectors routinely consider health outcomes, including benefits, harms, and health related-costs.

HiAP has also been described as an essential component of primary health care. HiAP has been most commonly implemented by federal, state and local governments, but it can also be applied to both private and non-profit policy-making.

== History ==
HiAP builds off the concepts embedded in "healthy public policies" and "intersectoral action for health," promoted over the past four decades. The spirit of Alma-Ata was carried forward in the Ottawa Charter for Health Promotion (adopted in Ottawa in 1986), which discussed "healthy public policies" as a key area for health promotion. Increased attention to the role of non-health sectors in promoting health continued to grow with discussions held at the Second International Conference on Health Promotion in Adelaide, Australia in 1988. In 2007, HiAP was recommended by Adelaide Thinker in Residence Ilona Kickbusch as a new approach to health and governance in South Australia.

== Definition ==
In the context of the 8th WHO Global Conference on Health Promotion, it has been defined as "an approach to public policies across sectors that systematically takes into account the health and health systems implications of decisions, seeks synergies, and avoids harmful health impacts, in order to improve population health and health equity." Such an approach is founded on health-related rights and obligations. It emphasizes the consequences of public policies on health determinants and aims to improve the accountability of policy-makers for health impacts at all levels of policy-making.

== Examples worldwide ==
HiAP has been widely implemented in many parts of the world.

=== Finland ===
One of the first countries to adopt a "healthy policies" approach to address public health concerns was Finland. The North Karelia Project, launched in 1972, aimed to reduce the impact of coronary heart disease in the Finnish region of North Karelia by engaging other sectors (like community organizations, dairy and meat producers, schools) to improve community health. The project, which involved the support of the Finnish authorities and the WHO, resulted in significant reductions in cardiovascular disease mortality and has been noted as a successful model for cross-sector collaboration. Finland has continued its work in HiAP. For example, in 2001 Finland formulated the principles for the implementation of the Health 2015 cooperation program that provides a framework for intersectoral health promotion. The purpose of the long-term health policy strategy is to improve health, help promote the adoption of healthy lifestyles among the Finnish people and to reduce health disparities between different groups of the population.

=== Australia ===
The implementation of HiAP in South Australia has focused on "developing a process to position HiAP as a core process of government, rather than an approach run by and for the health sector". The South Australian model of HiAP is based on two basic elements: central governance and accountability and a "health lens" analysis process.

The 2010 Adelaide Statement of Health in All Policies describes instances in which HiAP works best and provides tools that can be useful at different phases of policy implementation. While South Australia has formally adopted the concept of shared governance for health, critics have noted that South Australia is still far from having an established "health in all policies" governance system.

=== Canada ===
ActNow BC is an ongoing example of HiAP implementation in Canada. The intersectoral-based HiAP strategy aims to improve British Columbians' health by addressing common risk factors and reducing chronic diseases. Involving local governments, communities, employers, and schools, ActNow BC seeks to develop and promote programs that make British Columbians opt for healthy choices.

=== France ===
With the goal of implementing a global strategy to fight cancer, France launched the Cancer Plan in 2003. One of its main objectives was to reduce cancer mortality by 20% in 5 years, by establishing goals that involved the participation of multiple sectors. Evaluation of the plan in 2008 revealed that although progress was made in some areas, several of the goals were not met. Among the weaknesses of the plan, was the lack of consideration of social inequalities and access to health care and an ineffective coordination of patient care. To address the deficiencies of the 2003 plan and continue with its implementation, the French Government launched the Cancer Plan 2009-2013 in November 2009.

=== Thailand ===
Fueled by the health reform in 2000, Thailand has encouraged the practice of intersectoral collaboration by making the use of Health Impact Assessments (HIAs) mandatory at all levels of government. HIAs have been conducted to help combat the increasing number of health problems caused by air pollution, pesticide contamination, coal-fired power plants, and other environmental hazards. HIAs are seen as a valuable tool to promote collaboration between stakeholders to consider diverse interests and identify approaches to design a healthier society.

=== United States ===
==== Federal ====
Since 2009, the Departments of Transportation and Housing and Urban Development and the Environmental Protection Agency have worked together through the Partnership for Sustainable Communities. The three agencies jointly prioritized six livability principles that have been used to guide funding decisions, proposed policies, and legislative recommendations within the agencies. The principles target improvements in affordable housing, green building, transit, mixed-use development, water management, and brownfield space. Each of the principles promotes the mission of one or more of the individual agencies, such as efficient transportation, economic development, clean environment, etc. Many of the individual principles are also understood to contribute to health outcomes. Through a growing portfolio of case studies from at least 45 communities across the US, the partnership has demonstrated that individual elements of building healthier communities can contribute to other policy goals, such as greater economic development and better living conditions.

The concept of HiAP is included in section 4001 of the Patient Protection and Affordable Care Act (2010), which mandated creation of the National Prevention Council, led by the Surgeon General of the United States, and the development of the National Prevention Strategy. The National Prevention Strategy, published in June 2011, calls for increased coordination between government agencies, as well as partnerships with community organizations, businesses, healthcare providers, and others. The National Prevention Strategy prioritizes work around four strategic directions: creating healthy community environments, empowering individuals to make healthy choices, integrating clinical and community preventive services, and reducing health disparities. That can be accomplished, for example, through creating more neighborhoods with better access to fruits and vegetables, active transportation, and clean air.

==== State ====
California's Health in All Policies Task Force, created in 2010 by Executive Order S-04-10, represents the first formal statewide effort to bring together policy makers to identify and recommend programs, policies, and strategies to improve health using a HiAP framework. The task force, staffed by the California Department of Public Health, comprises 19 state agencies, offices, and departments, is under the auspices of the Strategic Growth Council, was created in 2008. The 2010 report, "Health in All Policies Task Force Report to the Strategic Growth Council," identifies 34 recommendations ranging from single actions to ongoing, multi-agency initiatives. All recommendations are linked to six principles: transport, housing, affordable healthy food, safe neighborhoods, green space, and that decision makers consider health consequences during policy development. Examples of recommendations include developing health criteria into discretionary funds review process and incorporating health issues into state data collection and survey efforts.

==== Local ====
The San Francisco Department of Public Health (SFDPH) has worked extensively to implement HiAP. For example, its Healthy Development Measurement Tool is a comprehensive set of evaluation and planning tools that bring health considerations into urban planning and development. The tools provide metrics to consider health in urban plans and stress the importance of gathering input from community members. SFDPH has also worked with community partners to conduct a variety of HIAs, including assessing the impact of changes to the living wage ordinance, housing policies, and zoning policies.

Use of HIA has increased among local entities across the United States. For example, an HIA was conducted in Downtown Los Angeles to assess all the possible health effects of a proposed development of a football stadium. A community coalition including Los Angeles Community Action Network, Physicians for Social Responsibility Los Angeles, and Comunidad Presente, worked with community members and Human Impact Partners, to gather information on the expected health effects of the proposed development and address concerns about loss of affordable housing, displacement of low-income individuals, and increases in noise and pollution. They developed a report describing current trends in health conditions, demographics, housing, employment, and safety, the expected impact of the proposed stadium, and a list of recommendations for mitigating harm. As a part of a larger legal case, presentation of the concerns resulted in receipt of $15 million to a housing trust fund to create and maintain low income housing, $1.9 million for air quality improvements, $300,000 for housing experts to address tenants' rights.

== Support ==
A HiAP approach has gained support from health advocates in the United States. The Institute of Medicine (IOM) acknowledges that policies made outside of the health sector shape the environments people live in and the choices they make. It notes that some public health problems are so complex that they are best tackled not only by traditional health policy but also by policies and issues that affect the social determinants of health such as schools, zoning, food advertising, public transportation, parks, workplaces, restaurants, and tax policy. The IOM recommends implementing a HiAP approach for more fully addressing the determinants of health, better coordinate efforts across sectors and more effectively using public resources.

Many public health associations have also endorsed HiAP. The American Public Health Association calls HiAP a "gold standard" and calls for increased HiAP infrastructure at all levels of government, increased funding for HiAP related research, practice and training, as well as establishment of best practices and a formal national research agenda. The National Association of County and City Health Officials (NACCHO), the first national association to adopt a position statement on HiAP, advocates for HiAP as a critical method to promote health and encourages local health departments to disseminate HiAP best practices to policy makers. The National Network of Public Health Institutes praise HiAP and see themselves and their member partners as potential facilitators of HiAP implementation.

== Critiques ==
The primary critiques of HiAP have raised concerns that HiAP breeds "health imperialism." They claim that by putting health concerns at the top of agendas, HiAP may appear to prioritize health as an outcome most worthy of policy makers' attention, diluting attention to other outcomes under the agencies’ authority. Proponents of HiAP have contended that health is not the only domain of societal well-being that can benefit from interdisciplinary policy making. They suggest that rather than viewing HiAP as an attempt to increase the influence of health professionals, HiAP might be used as a template for future movements such as "economics in all policies" and "education in all policies".

The IOM acknowledges many fundamental challenges to HiAP. While there are many examples where cooperation is mutually beneficial, there are also examples where the aims of one interest directly conflicts with another. For example, since the 1950s, efforts by public health professionals to limit tobacco sales have been in opposition to efforts of the tobacco industry to maintain personal freedoms for citizens and a free market environment for cigarette manufactures. Even non-controversial outcomes, such as increased income and education, can also raise contentions through ideological differences for accomplishing these goals.

Some groups have also questioned the rigor with which the health impacts of non-health policies have been or can be assessed. Critics note the difficulties inherent in collecting data that provides a description of current (baseline) conditions and predicting estimates of a policy's potential impact on health. Furthermore, training and supporting individuals to conduct such assessments is a challenge.

== Health impact assessment ==
While implementation of HiAP can be done through many mechanisms, such as policy development, program management and service delivery, the most widely promoted and cited mechanism to implementing HiAP is HIA. HIA is defined as "a systematic process that uses an array of data sources and analytic methods and considers input from stakeholders to determine the potential effects of a proposed policy, plan, program, or project on the health of a population and the distribution of those effects within the population". In recent years, many have called attention to the need to make a clearer distinction between HIA and HiAP, citing HIA as one component of HiAP, a broader strategy that seeks to achieve better health outcomes, improve quality of life, and reduce health disparities.

== Future of policies ==
In June 2013, Finland's Ministry of Social Affairs and the WHO hosted the 8th Global Conference on Health Promotion in Helsinki. Among its main objectives, the conference addressed the challenges facing the implementation of HiAP, encouraged the exchange of past experiences, which could lead to the design of effective pathways for intersectoral collaboration, and analyzed the impact and advancement of health promotion since the first conference on health promotion in 1987. As a contribution to the conference, the Ministry of Social Affairs and Health has published a book with a global scope to help policy-makers worldwide to implement HiAP. In 2017, to improve accountability for the pledges made by countries in the Rio Political Declaration on Social Determinants of Health, the World Health Organization and United Nations Children's Fund called for the monitoring of intersectoral interventions on the social determinants of health that improve health equity, noting that the World Health Organization is developing the first global monitoring system for intersectoral interventions that are known to improve health equity.
