= International Network of Health Promoting Hospitals and Health Services =

The International Network of Health Promoting Hospitals and Health Services (HPH) is a nonprofit, non-governmental organization that was initiated by the World Health Organization (WHO) in 1988. It is also known simply as HPH, or "Health Promoting Hospitals." HPH is based on the settings approach to health promotion philosophy of the WHO as outlined in the WHO Ottawa Charter for Health Promotion (WHO 1986). The organization's main aim is to improve the health gain of hospitals and health services by a bundle of strategies targeting patients, staff, and the community.

== History ==
Based on the Ottawa Charter for Health Promotion, the first conceptual developments on HPH started in 1988. A first model project "Health and Hospital", was initiated in 1989 at the Rudolfstiftung Hospital in Vienna, Austria, and successfully finished in 1996. 10 model documents (in German language) summarise the learnings from the pilot project and are available online to guide hospital projects related to health promotion.

In 1990, the WHO International Network of Health Promoting Hospitals was founded as a multi-city action plan of the WHO Healthy Cities Network. In 1991, the HPH network, which was in the beginning an alliance of experts, launched its first policy document, the Budapest Declaration on Health Promoting Hospitals. This document introduces the HPH concept and target groups - patients, staff, community - as well as related HPH strategies and action areas.

In order to implement HPH on a broader basis, a European Pilot Hospital Project of Health Promoting Hospitals was initiated in 1993, and finished in 1997. 20 hospitals from 11 European countries participated, 19 of which finished the project successfully. Also in 1993, the first
international HPH conference was organised, and the first international HPH Newsletter was published.

Since 1995, national and regional networks of HPH, all coordinated by their own national or regional coordinating centres, are being implemented and developed in order to disseminate HPH to as many hospitals and health care institutions as possible. The development of the HPH networks called for a new policy document: The Vienna Recommendations on Health Promoting Hospitals were launched in 1997.

In 2009, HPH has become a global movement with national and regional networks, individual member hospitals and health promotion initiatives on all continents. There are currently around 600 member hospitals in the HPH network from over 20 countries.

== Concept ==
HPH combines a vision, a concept, and a set of 18 core strategies and 5 standards.

In accordance to health promotion theory, the HPH standards and strategies are based on the principles of the settings approach to health promotion, empowerment and enablement, participation, a holistic concept of health (somato-psycho-social concept of health), intersectoral cooperation, equity, sustainability, and multi-strategy. This reflects a salutogenic approach.

In order to realise the full potential of the comprehensive HPH approach for increasing the health gain of hospital patients, staff, and the community, HPH needs to be supported by an organisational structure: Support from top management, a management structure that embraces all organisatial units, a budget, specific aims and targets, action plans, projects, and programs, standards, guidelines and other tools for implementing health promotion into everyday business. This needs to be supported by evaluation and monitoring, professional training and education, research and dissemination.

One way to implement HPH in a hospital or other health care organisation is by linking HPH aims and targets with quality management, thus understanding health promotion as one specific quality aspect in hospitals and health care. Ideally any managerial or professional decision in an HPH should also consider the health/ disease impact of that decision, together with other decision criteria (e.g. effectiveness, sustainability).

=== Core Documents ===
The concept of health promotion in hospital and health services is based on 6 policy documents:

- Ottawa Charter for Health Promotion (1986)
- Budapest Declaration of Health Promoting Hospitals (1991)
- Ljubliana Charter on Reforming Health Care (1996)
- Jakarta Declaration (1997)
- The Vienna Recommendations on Health Promoting Hospitals (1997)
- The Bangkok Charter (2006)

== Structure & Organization ==
The International Network of Health Promoting Hospitals is steered by a Governance Board composed of 7 members who are experts in the field of health promotion. In addition to the governance board, 2 standing observers (including Jürgen Pelikan) are responsible for organizing a yearly international conference, and the HPH International Secretariat, promote and assist the advancement of the concept of health promotion in hospitals and health services.

In an open tender process in May 2019, the General HPH Assembly awarded the International Secretariat to the team of Dr. Oliver Grone at OptiMedis AG. The new International Secretariat has grown the HPH membership base to include health institutions other than hospitals and has broadened the objective of the network in line with the Sustainable Development Goals.

Since the end of 2019, the HPH network is become officially known as the International Network of Health Promoting Hospitals & Health Services.

== Activities ==
=== Standards ===
The HPH network promotes the use of standards developed for implementing health promotion in hospitals. This manual includes self-assessment forms and is available in 6 other languages, including Chinese, German, Russian, French, Japanese, and Persian.

The HPH Network is working to develop a broader set of umbrella standards by the end of 2020. HPH members, as well as external experts in the field of health promotion are co-developing the new standard set.

=== Task Forces and Working Groups ===
Several task forces and working groups develop specific HPH concepts, strategies and tools on specific subjects or for specific clinical areas:

- The environment
- Migration, equity, and diversity
- Age-friendly health care
- Implementation and monitoring of HPH standards
- Children and adolescents
- Patient and family engaged health care
- Health literate health care organizations
- The health-promoting built environment

=== International Conference ===
The HPH Network hosts a yearly, international conference for its members to exchange ideas and advancements in health promotion.
