= Health impact assessment =

Type of public health document

Health impact assessment (HIA) is defined as "a combination of procedures, methods, and tools by which a policy, program, or project may be judged as to its potential effects on the health of a population, and the distribution of those effects within the population." (ECHP 1999, p. 4)

== Overview ==
HIA is intended to produce a set of evidence-based recommendations to inform decision-making (Taylor & Quigley 2002, p. 2). HIA seeks to maximise the positive health impacts and minimise the negative health impacts of proposed policies, programs or projects. Health assessment of the broad range of public service investments was proposed at the launch of WHO's Kobe Centre for Health Development in March 1996 by Dr Greg Parston, then Chief Executive of the Office for Public Management.

The procedures of HIA are similar to those used in other forms of impact assessment, such as environmental impact assessment or social impact assessment. HIA is usually described as following the steps listed, though many practitioners break these into sub-steps or label them differently:

1. Screening – determining if an HIA is warranted/required
2. Scoping – determining which impacts will be considered and the plan for the HIA
3. Identification and assessment of impacts – determining the magnitude, nature, extent and likelihood of potential health impacts, using a variety of different methods and types of information
4. Decision-making and recommendations – making explicit the trade-offs to be made in decision-making and formulating evidence-informed recommendations
5. Evaluation, monitoring and follow-up – process and impact evaluation of the HIA and the monitoring and management of health impacts

The main objective of HIA is to apply existing knowledge and evidence about health impacts, to specific social and community contexts, to develop evidence-based recommendations that inform decision-making in order to protect and improve community health and wellbeing. Because of financial and time constraints, HIAs do not generally involve new research or the generation of original scientific knowledge. However, the findings of HIAs, especially where these have been monitored and evaluated over time, can be used to inform other HIAs in contexts that are similar. An HIA's recommendations may focus on both design and operational aspects of a proposal.

HIA has also been identified as a mechanism by which potential health inequalities can be identified and redressed prior to the implementation of proposed policy, program or project (Acheson 1998).

A number of manuals and guidelines for HIA's use have been developed (see further reading).

== Determinants of health ==
The proposition that policies, programs and projects have the potential to change the determinants of health underpins HIA's use. Changes to health determinants then leads to changes in health outcomes or the health status of individuals and communities. The determinants of health are largely environmental and social, so that there are many overlaps with environmental impact assessment and social impact assessment.

== Levels of HIA ==
Three forms of HIA exist:

- Desk-based HIA, which takes 2–6 weeks for one assessor to complete and provides a broad overview of potential health impacts;
- Rapid HIA, which takes approximately 12 weeks for one assessor to complete and provides more detailed information on potential health impacts; and
- Comprehensive HIA, which takes approximately 6 months for one assessor and provides a in-depth assessment of potential health impacts. (IMPACT 2004, p. 7)

It has been suggested that HIAs can be prospective (done before a proposal is implemented), concurrent (done while the proposal is being implemented) or retrospective (done after a proposal has been implemented) (Taylor, Gorman & Quigley 2003, p. 1). This remains controversial, however, with a number of HIA practitioners suggesting that concurrent HIA is better regarded as a monitoring activity and that retrospective HIA is more akin to evaluation with a health focus, rather than being assessment per se (Kemm 2003, p. 387). Prospective HIA is preferred as it allows the maximum practical opportunity to influence decision-making and subsequent health impacts.

== HIA practitioners ==
HIA practitioners can be found in the private and public sectors, but are relatively few in number. There are no universally accepted competency frameworks or certification processes. It is suggested that a lead practitioner should have extensive education and training in a health related field, experience of participating in HIAs, and have attended an HIA training course. It has been suggested and widely accepted that merely having a medical or health degree should not be regarded as an indication of competency.

== HIA worldwide ==
HIA used around the world, most notably in Europe, North America, Australia, New Zealand, Africa and Thailand (Winkler et al. 2020).

The safeguard policies and standards of the International Finance Corporation (IFC), part of the World Bank, were established in 2006. These contain a requirement for health impact assessment in large projects. The standards have been accepted by most of the leading lending banks who are parties to the Equator Principles. Health impact assessments are becoming routine in many large development projects in both public and private sectors of developing countries. There is also a long history of health impact assessment in the water resource development sector - large dams and irrigation systems.

Of the regional development banks, the Asian Development Bank has the longest and most consistent history of engaging with HIA. This engagement dates back to 1992, when it produced its first HIA Guidelines (ADB, 1992); this focused on the state of the art of methods and procedures at this early stage in the development of HIA. A second guidance document, a primer on health impacts of Development Project was published ten years later (Peralta and Hunt, 2003), with a focus on health risks and opportunities in development from sector-specific perspectives. Between 2015 and 2018, the Governments of Australia and the UK funded the Regional Malaria and Other Communicable Disease Threats Trust Fund (RMTF) which supported multi-country, cross-border and multisector responses to urgent malaria and other communicable disease issues, focused on the countries of the Greater Mekong Subregion (GMS). Under the domain of promotion and prevention mainly HIA capacity development was addressed. This resulted in a new publication: Health Impact Assessment: A Good Practice Source Book (2018).

== See also ==
- Impact assessment
  - Environmental impact assessment
  - Equality impact assessment
  - Four-step impact assessment
  - Health equity impact analysis
  - Healthy development measurement tool
  - Risk assessment
  - Social impact assessment
- Health promotion
  - Jakarta Declaration
  - Ottawa Charter for Health Promotion
- Health protection
  - Environmental health
  - List of environmental health hazards
  - Precautionary principle
  - Risk assessment
- Population health
  - Public health
  - Social determinants of health
