= Alliance for Healthy Cities =

The Alliance for Healthy Cities (AFHC) is a cooperative international alliance aimed at protecting and enhancing the health and health care of city dwellers. It is composed of groups of cities, urban districts and other organizations from countries around the world in exchanging information to achieve the goal through a health promotion approach called healthy cities. The chair city for the alliance is Ichikawa, Japan.

The alliance and its members work in favour of the healthy city, defined by the World Health Organization (WHO) as "one that is continually creating and improving those physical and social environments and expanding those community resources which enable people to mutually support each other in performing all the functions of life and in developing to their maximum potential".

== History ==
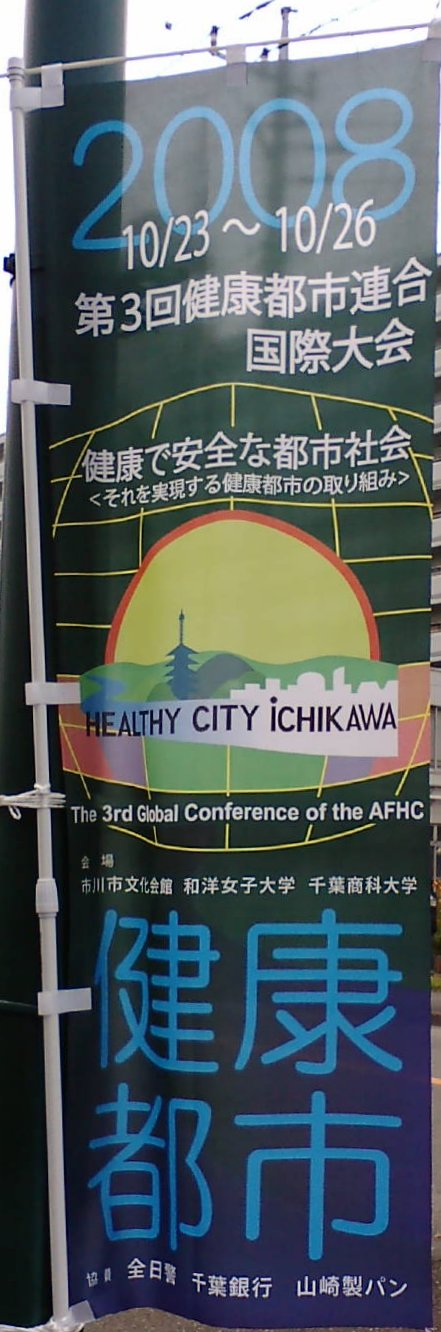
AFHC third conference nobori in Ichikawa, Chiba in October 2008

The first international declaration that promoted the concepts underlying healthy cities, the Alma Ata Declaration, was adopted at the International Conference for Primary Health Care, jointly convened by the WHO and UNICEF in Almaty (formerly Alma-Ata), presently in Kazakhstan, 6–12 September 1978. The primary health care strategy endorsed and targeted health for all the people of the world by the year 2000.

Various discussions have taken place since then. Trevor Hancock and Leonard Duhl promoted the term "Healthy Cities" in consultation with the WHO:

Economic development has brought comfort and convenience to many people in the industrialized world, but in its wake are pollution, new health problems, blighted urban landscapes and social isolation. Growing numbers of the dispossessed are also being left on the sidelines as the disparity between rich and poor grows. In an effort to remedy these ills, people from disparate backgrounds in thousands of communities are joining together with government agencies under the Healthy Cities/Healthy Communities banner to improve the quality of life in their towns and cities.

At the First International Conference on Health Promotion in 1986, the Ottawa Charter for Health Promotion was adopted that presented actions to achieve healthy life for all people by the year 2000 and beyond.

Following a second international conference on health promotion at Adelaide in 1988 and a third at Sundsvall in 1991, and twenty years after the Alma Ata Declaration, the Fourth International Conference on Health Promotion held in July 1997 in Jakarta adopted the new Jakarta Declaration: "New Players for a New Era - Leading Health Promotion into the 21st Century". It came at a critical moment in the development of international PHC strategies.

== List of members ==
=== Australia ===
- City of Casey
- Corio and Norlane Development Advisory Board
- City of Gold Coast
- Illawarra (Wollongong and Shellharbour)
- Municipality of Kiama
- Logan City
- City of Marion
- City of Townsville
- Healthy Cities Onkaparinga

=== Cambodia ===
- Phnom Penh

=== China ===
- Central and Western District, Hong Kong
- Changshu
- Huai'an
- Islands District, Hong Kong
- Kowloon City District, Hong Kong
- Kunshan
- Kwai Tsing District, Hong Kong
- Kwun Tong District, Hong Kong
- Luohu District
- Macau
- North District, Hong Kong
- Sai Kung District, Hong Kong
- Sha Tin District, Hong Kong
- Southern District, Hong Kong
- Suzhou
- Taicang
- Tai Po District
- Tongzhou, Jiangsu
- Tsuen Wan District, Hong Kong
- Wujiang, Jiangsu
- Yau Tsim Mong District, Hong Kong
- Zhangjiagang

=== Japan ===
- Abashiri
- Abiko
- Aisai
- Ama
- Fujieda
- Fukuroi
- Hamamatsu
- Ichikawa
- Izumisano
- Kameyama
- Kasama
- Kashiwa
- Kitanagoya
- Kobe
- Minokamo
- Miyakojima
- Myōkō
- Nagareyama
- Nagoya
- Nagakute
- Nishitokyo
- Obihiro
- Ōbu
- Ōsaki
- Owariasahi
- Seiyo
- Shikokuchūō
- Suita
- Tahara
- Taitō
- Tajimi
- Takamatsu
- Tōon
- Yamato
- Yawatahama

=== South Korea ===
- Andong
- Asan
- Buk-gu, Ulsan
- Busan
- Busanjin-gu, Busan
- Buyeo County
- Changwon
- Chuncheon
- Dobong-gu
- Dong-gu, Gwangju
- Donghae City
- Dongjak-gu
- Gangdong-gu
- Gangnam-gu
- Geumsan
- Guro-gu
- Gwangjin-gu
- Gwangmyeong
- Hadong
- Hwaseong, Gyeonggi
- Jangheung
- Jangsu
- Jecheon
- Jeju-do
- Jeonju
- Jincheon
- Jinju
- Jung-gu, Seoul
- Muju County
- Nam-gu, Gwangju
- Namhae
- Seocho-gu
- Seodaemun-gu
- Seo-gu, Gwangju
- Seongbuk-gu
- Seongdong-gu
- Seosan
- Seoul
- Sokcho
- Songpa-gu
- Siheung
- Suncheon, Jeollanam-do
- Taebaek
- Uiwang
- Wando
- Wonju
- Yanggu, Gangwon
- Yangpyeong
- Yangsan
- Yeongdeungpo-gu
- Yeongi
- Yongsan-gu

=== Malaysia ===
- Kuching

=== Mongolia ===
- Ulaanbaatar

=== Netherlands ===
- Rotterdam

=== Philippines ===
- Caloocan
- Dagupan
- Las Piñas
- Makati
- Marikina
- Muntinlupa
- Pasig
- Parañaque
- San Fernando
- Tagaytay
- Valencia

=== Vietnam ===
- Huế

== See also ==
- Public health
- UNICEF
- Primary health care
  - Alma Ata Declaration
- Health promotion
  - Ottawa Charter for Health Promotion
  - Jakarta Declaration
