= Health risk assessment =

System of information collection and screening in healthcare

A health risk assessment (also referred to as a health risk appraisal and health & well-being assessment) is a questionnaire about a person's medical history, demographic characteristics and lifestyle. It is one of the most widely used screening tools in the field of health promotion and is often the first step in multi-component health promotion programs.

== Definition ==
A health risk assessment (HRA) is a health questionnaire, used to provide individuals with an evaluation of their health risks and quality of life. Commonly a HRA incorporates three key elements – an extended questionnaire, a risk calculation or score, and some form of feedback, i.e. face-to-face with a health advisor or an automatic online report.

The Centers for Disease Control and Prevention define a HRA as: "a systematic approach to collecting information from individuals that identifies risk factors, provides individualised feedback, and links the person with at least one intervention to promote health, sustain function and/or prevent disease".

There is a range of different HRAs available for adults and children. Some target specific populations. For example, in the US, Medicare HRAs ask seniors about their ability to perform daily activities. Medicaid assessments ask questions about health-care access, availability of food, and living conditions. Most HRAs capture information relating to:

- Demographic characteristics – age, sex
- Lifestyle – exercise, smoking, alcohol intake, diet
- Personal and family medical history (in the US, due to the current interpretation of the Genetic Information Nondiscrimination Act, questions regarding family medical history are not permitted if there is any incentive attached to taking a HRA)
- Physiological data – weight, height, blood pressure, cholesterol
- Attitudes and willingness to change behaviour in order to improve health

The main objectives of a HRA are to:

- Assess health status
- Estimate the level of health risk
- Inform and provide feedback to participants to motivate behaviour change to reduce health risks

In the US, HRAs used as part of the Medicare Annual Wellness Visit help identify issues important to a senior's health and well-being. HRAs used as part of Medicaid enrollment help identify individuals with health problems that need immediate attention. The Community Preventive Services Task Force (CPSTF) recommends the use of HRAs in workplace settings when used in combination with health education, having found there is strong or satisfactory evidence that they help improve the following behaviors among employees:

- Tobacco
- Consuming too much alcohol
- Seat belts
- Fat consumption
- Blood pressure
- Absenteeism
- Healthcare services use
- Summary health risk estimates

== History ==
The original concept of the HRA can be traced back to the decision by the assistant Surgeon General of the United States to conduct a study to determine the probable 10-year lifespan of individuals based on lifestyles and predisposed conditions. The project, led by Lewis C. Robbins, MD, of the Public Health Service, was the Framingham study. The study was based on in-depth longitudinal studies of 5,000 families in Framingham, Massachusetts, that continues to this day under funding from the National Institutes of Health.

Dr. Robbins left the Public Health Service and joined Methodist Hospital in Indianapolis where, working with Jack Hall, M.D., he developed the first set of health hazard tables. This culminated in the publication of How to Practice Prospective Medicine in 1970 – a guide for practising physicians, which outlined the health risk assessment questionnaire, risk computations and patient feedback strategies. During the 1960s, some researchers in California formed the Human Population Laboratory (HPL) to investigate factors contributing to quality of life. Inspired by a research article reporting on the HPL's Alameda County Study on the best lifestyle practices for good health, Don R. Hall, DrPH, developed a Health Age Assessment algorithm on a calculator while a masters student at Loma Linda University in 1972. In 1977, Hall coded his longevity calculations on a TRS-80, creating the first computerized health risk assessment. Within a year, he had programmed 12 health assessments on single topics such as nutrition, fitness, weight, and stress. In 1979, when personal desktop computers became readily available, he packaged all 12 assessments together on a floppy disk and marketed it as a comprehensive health risk assessment.

It was not until 1980, when the Centers for Disease Control and Prevention released a publicly available version, that the HRA became widely used, particularly in workplace settings. Health and Welfare Canada reviewed How to Practice Prospective Medicine and created a mainframe version of the book. The Centers for Disease Control became aware of this product and adapted it to the newly available personal computer. When Prudential Life Insurance also took an interest and asked to fund an update of the program, the CDC, which could not accept private project funding at the time, transferred ownership to the Carter Center at Emory University where it was updated from 1986 to 1987. The transfer and subsequent program were managed by Dr. Ed Hutchins, who had worked on the HRA in positions at the University of Pennsylvania and Charlotte-Mecklenburg Hospital. At Charlotte Mecklenburg, he secured a contract with the World Health Organization to create a mainframe product that could be used on an international basis. The HRA was managed as a not-for-profit product. Copies were distributed to every state health department, and liaisons were assigned to each to work with their staffs to evaluate related data. Over 2,000 copies of the software were distributed to users who requested it, and approximately 70 copies of the code were provided to for-profit companies that were interested in developing proprietary products. This proliferation coincided with the rapid growth in interest in corporate health promotion programs as awareness developed on health risks and for-profit vendors monetized the programs.

The Carter Center's interest shifted to Africa and Dr. Hutchins founded the Healthier People Network (HPN) in 1991 to continue the work. HPN raised funds to support the HRA, but additional funding was not forthcoming from government sources. As a result, the Carter Center and HPN could not underwrite basic supporting activities such as annual conferences and, over time, the State-based liaison network and associated intellectual capital atrophied as programs lost funding and liaisons moved on.

The use of HRAs and corporate wellness programs has been most prevalent in the United States, with comparatively slower growth elsewhere. However, there has been recent strong growth in corporate wellness outside the US, particularly in Europe and Asia.

== Usage ==
Once an individual completes a HRA, they usually receive a report, detailing their health rating or score, often broken down into specific sub scores and areas such as stress, nutrition and fitness. The report can also provide recommendations on how individuals can reduce their health risks by changing their lifestyle.

In addition to individual feedback, HRAs are also used to provide aggregated data reporting for employers and organizations. These reports include demographic data of participants, highlight health risk areas and often include cost projections and savings in terms of increased healthcare, absence and productivity. Organization-level reports can then be used to provide a first step by which organizations can target and monitor appropriate health interventions within their workforce.

== HRA delivery ==
The delivery of HRAs has changed over the years in conjunction with advances in technology. Initially distributed as paper-based, self-scoring questionnaires through on-site workplace health promotion sessions, HRAs are now most commonly implemented online. Other delivery methods include telephone, mail and face-to-face.

The advantages of online HRAs include:

- Tailoring – online HRAs can adapt content based on an individual's answers to the HRA questionnaire to provide a personalised, relevant and interactive user experience.
- Improved data management
- Reduced administrative costs
- Instant feedback

== Efficacy ==
Extensive research has shown that HRAs can be used effectively to:

- Identify health risk factors
- Predict health-related costs
- Measure absenteeism and presenteeism
- Evaluate the efficacy and return on investment of health promotion strategies

There is also recent evidence to suggest that taking a HRA alone can have a positive effect on health behavior change and health status. However, it is generally accepted that HRAs are most effective at promoting behavior change when they form part of an integrated, multi-component health promotion program. Applied in this way, the HRA is used primarily as a tool to identify health risks within a population and then target health interventions and behavior change programs to address these areas.

== Limitations ==
The limitations of a HRA are largely related to its usage and it is important to recognise that a HRA highlights health risks but does not diagnose disease and should not replace consultation with a medical or health practitioner.

== Providers ==
There are reportedly over 50 different HRA providers in the market, offering a variety of versions and formats. Major vendors generally have National Committee for Quality Assurance (NCQA) Wellness and Health Promotion (WHP) Certification or Health Information Products (HIP) Certification.
