= Venediktov =

Venediktov (Russian: Венедиктов, Ukrainian: Венедіктов) is a Russian masculine surname originating from the Latin name Benedictus (meaning blessed); its feminine counterpart is Venediktova. It may refer to the following notable people:

- Alexei Venediktov (born 1955), Russian journalist
- Dimitri Venediktov, Deputy Health Minister of the Soviet Union
- Lev Venediktov (1924–2017), Soviet and Ukrainian choral conductor
- Iryna Venediktova, Ukrainian politician and lawyer
