= Bangkok Charter =

The Bangkok Charter for Health Promotion in a Globalized World is the name of an international agreement reached among participants of the 6th Global Conference on Health Promotion held in Bangkok, Thailand in August 2005, convened by the World Health Organization. It identifies actions, commitments and pledges required to address the determinants of health in a globalized world through health promotion.

== About the Declaration ==
The Bangkok Charter recognizes:

- the health inequality between developed and developing nations
- the changing trend of communication and consumption in a globalized world
- urbanization
- global environmental change
- commercialization

Five key areas of action for a healthier world:

1. Partner and build alliances with private, non-private, non-governmental or international organizations to create sustainable actions
2. Invest in sustainable policies, actions and infrastructure to address the determinants of health
3. Build capacity for policy development, health promotion practice and health literacy
4. Regulate and legislate to ensure a high level of protection from harm and enable equal opportunity for health and well-being
5. Advocate health based on human rights and solidarity

== See also ==
- Health promotion
  - Ottawa Charter
  - Jakarta Declaration
- Primary health care
  - Health for all
- Global health
- Health policy
- Public health
