= Society of Global Health Researchers in Action =

The Society of Global Health Researchers in Action (SOGHR) is a student-run 501(c)(3) not-for-profit organization founded in 2006 by Phoenix Mourning-Star, a student at Colorado State University. Based in Fort Collins, Colorado, SOGHR is "dedicated to supporting students and early career researchers in the global health sciences."

== See also ==
- Public health
- Primary health care
- Sustainable development
- Millennium Development Goals
