= Alma-Ata Declaration =

Alma-Ata Declaration may refer:

- Alma-Ata Protocol, 1991 document
- Alma Ata Declaration, 1978 document
