= Health Promotion International =

- Subject: Health promotion
- Language: English
- Edited by: -

Publication details
- History: 1986-present
- Publisher: Oxford University Press
- Frequency: Bimonthly
- Impact factor: 2.4 (2024)

Standard abbreviations
- ISO 4: Health Promot. Int.

Indexing
- CODEN: HPINET
- ISSN: 0957-4824 (print); 1460-2245 (web)
- LCCN: 93643752
- OCLC no.: 890274199

Links
- Journal homepage; Online archive

Health Promotion International is a peer-reviewed public health journal covering health promotion which publishes six issues a year through a continuous model of publication. It was established in 1986 at the John Snow Pub on Broadwick Street in London, England. The journal's founder was Ilona Kickbusch, who is now the chair emerita of its editorial board. Originally named Health Promotion, the journal obtained its current name in 1990. It is published by Oxford University Press.

The current Editor-in-Chief for the Journal is Professor Samantha Thomas (January 2023 - ). Professor Thomas is Professor of Public Health at Deakin University and is known for her research in the commercial and political determinants of health. The Chair of the Boards is Emeritus Professor Mike Daube AO. In their first editorial for Health Promotion International, Thomas and Daube outlined their vision for the journal:

“It is important to encourage critical thinking, engage in debate and difficult conversations, and hear about the challenges that face us. But we should also hear about the successes that those engaged in health promotion have achieved and continue to achieve, despite all the challenges they face. There is much to learn from these, not least that the benefits of preventive action often take time to materialise, and that even when there are good outcomes, there is never room for complacency.”

The Journal showed improvements in Impact Metrics for 2024, including an increased 2024 impact factor of 2.4, and an increased Scopus Citescore of 5.0. It is a Q1 ranked journal for Health (Social Science). In 2024 the Journal had a total full text readership of 1,199,390.

The Journal has recently published special issues on the Commercial Determinants of Health, and the Digital Determinants of Health. The Journal has also aimed to support and provide opportunities for Early Career Researchers through the Mike Daube Early Career Advocacy Series, and through appointments to Associate Editor team and Boards.

In 2023, Health Promotion International decided to preclude research or commentary directly or indirectly funded by the tobacco, alcohol, commercial gambling, ultra-processed food, fossil fuel and arms industries, in an “effort to disrupt harmful industry influence over science”.

In 2025, Oxford University Press announced that Health Promotion International will be a fully open access journal beginning with the 2026 volume on January 1, 2026.
