= Lalonde report =

1974 report

The Lalonde Report is a 1974 report produced in Canada formally titled A new perspective on the health of Canadians. It proposed the concept of the "health field", identifying two main health-related objectives: the health care system; and prevention of health problems and promotion of good health. The report is considered the "first modern government document in the Western world to acknowledge that our emphasis upon a biomedical health care system is wrong, and that we need to look beyond the traditional health care (sick care) system if we wish to improve the health of the public.". The Report also recognizes that use of the local Health System shapes how people define their health-related need, options for care and definition of health.

== Background ==
Marc Lalonde, who was the Canadian Minister of National Health and Welfare in 1974, proposed a new "health field" concept, as distinct from medical care. Lalonde noted that the "traditional or generally-accepted view of the health field is that the art or science of medicine has been the fount from which all improvements in health have flowed, and popular belief equates the level of health with the quality of medicine." The new concept "envisage[d] that the health field can be broken up into four broad elements: Human biology, Environment, Lifestyle, and Health care organization;" that is, determinants of health existed outside of the health care systems.

The report was written by a group of civil servants led by Hubert (Bert) Laframboise, based on population studies in Canada, where care aims to address one of the most ethnically diverse populations in the world.

The report is considered to have led to the development and evolution of health promotion, recognizing both the need for people to take more responsibility in changing their behaviors to improve their own health, and also the contribution of healthy communities and environments to health.

Another innovation of the report was that it proposed that public health interventions should focus attention on that segment of the population with the highest level of risk exposure. It this sense, the report was fundamental in identifying health risk behaviours as a determinant of health inequalities.

The proposals advocated by the report seem to have had mixed outcomes; while its nutritional and exercise recommendations are believed to have been widely accepted, there remains disagreement about its overall impact on population health. It has been argued such debates highlight the need for a fuller exploration of the health policies in place.

== Health field ==
The concept of the "health field", as identified in the Lalonde report, is considered to be composed of four interdependent fields determined to influence individual's health. These include:

- Biology: all aspects of health, physical and mental, developed within the human body as influenced by genetic make-up;
- Environmental: all matters related to health external to the human body, over which the individual has little or no control, including the physical and social environment;
- Lifestyle: the aggregation of personal decisions (i.e. over which the individual has control) that can be said to contribute to, or cause, illness or death;
- Health care organization: includes medical practice, nursing, hospitals, nursing homes, medical drugs, public health services, paramedic services, dental treatment and other health services.

== See also ==
- Alma-Ata declaration
- Health inequalities
- Public health
- Social determinants of health
