= Cardiovascular disease in China =

Health issue in China

Cardiovascular disease in China is on the rise. Health statistics shows that the ischemic heart disease mortality rate in rural China has approximately doubled since 1988. While heart disease rates have been rising more rapidly in rural regions since 2009, Cardiovascular disease is the primary cause of mortality among both urban and rural populations, accounting for nearly half of all deaths in 2020.

Unlike in developed countries, there is no preventive or primary health care system in place to stop the rise of cardiac disease. The true prevalence of heart disease in rural China remains unclear due to rural providers have low levels of competence to diagnose and manage patients presenting with cardiovascular disease despite expanded access to primary care. There is a need to ascertain the real incidence and prevalence of heart disease and to develop adequate preventive and primary care in the Chinese countryside.

== Stroke ==
Stroke is the largest cardiovascular killer in China at about 40% of total mortality in 2007 (approx. 280 per 100 000)
