= Health equity impact analysis =

A health equity impact analysis (HEIA) is a decision-support tool which walks users through the steps of identifying how a program, policy or similar initiative will impact population groups in different ways. HEIAs are meant to show, inter alia, unintended potential impacts. The goal is to maximize positive impacts and reduce negative impacts that could potentially widen health disparities between population groups. According to the U.S. Department of Health and Human Services, "Physical activity, along with proper nutrition, is beneficial to people of all ages, backgrounds, and abilities. And it is important that everyone gets active: over the last 20 years, there's been a significant increase in obesity in the United States."
