= Jakarta Declaration =

The Jakarta Declaration on Leading Health Promotion into the 21st Century, officially the Fourth International Conference on Health Promotion: New Players for a New Era – Leading Health Promotion into the 21st Century, was a meeting on health promotion held in Jakarta, Indonesia from 21–25 July 1997 that resulted in the signing of an international declaration on health by member states of the World Health Organization (WHO). The Jakarta Declaration followed and built off previous global health agreements, including previous International Conferences on Health Promotion held in Ottawa in 1986, Adelaide in 1988 and Sundsvall in 1991. The declaration reiterated the importance of agreements made in the Ottawa Charter, and added emphasis to certain aspects of health promotion.

The Ottawa Charter defines health promotion as the "process of enabling people to increase control over, and to improve their health" with the ultimate goal of increasing health expectancy and narrowing health expectancy gaps between different groups and countries. The main purpose of the Jakarta Declaration was to build off the original strategies set out by the Ottawa Charter to meet emerging threats to health in the 21st century. As such, it included five priorities for future health promotion: promoting social responsibility, increasing investments for health developments, consolidating and expanding health partnerships, increase community capacity and empowering individuals, and securing the proper infrastructure for health promotion.

== About the Declaration ==
The Jakarta Declaration included the following five "priorities for health promotion in the 21st century":

1. "Promote social responsibility for health"
2. "Increase investments for health development"
3. "Consolidate and expand partnerships for health"
4. "increase community capacity and empower the individual"
5. "Secure an infrastructure for health promotion"

The declaration recognizes that":

- Participation is necessary for change.
- Health literacy is essential for participation – emphasizes the need for access to education and information and hence, the empowerment of individuals and communities.
- Combinations of five strategies for health promotion – "build healthy public policy", "create supportive environments", "strengthen community action", "develop personal skills", and "reorient health services"—are more effective than "single-track approaches".

== Promotion of the Declaration ==
In the United Kingdom, the central message of the Jakarta declaration is similar to the government's current health policy. That is the emphasis on infrastructure and investment, with the hope of empowering the service user with choice.

== See also ==
- Health promotion
  - Ottawa Charter for Health Promotion
  - Bangkok Charter for Health Promotion in a Globalized World
- Healthy city
  - Alliance for Healthy Cities
- Primary health care
- Public health
- World Health Organization
