= Alameda County Study =

California health study

The Alameda County Study is a longitudinal study of residents from Alameda County, California, which examines the relationship between lifestyle and health. The "1965 cohort" were given health questionnaires in 1965, 1973, 1985, 1988, 1994, and 1999. The researchers found that those who followed five practices lived healthier and longer lives:

- Avoiding smoking.
- Exercising regularly.
- Maintaining a healthy body weight.
- Sleeping seven to eight hours per night.
- Limiting consumption of alcoholic drinks.

Another study of the Alameda cohort suggests that social and community ties can also help an individual to live longer.

Later studies of the cohort considered the impact of religiosity, social status, and hearing loss on health outcomes.

== See also ==
- Blue Zone
- Health § Self-care strategies
- Religiosity
- Self care
- Social support § Benefits
