= Dimitri Venediktov =

Soviet and Russian politician (1929–2021)

- Дмитрий Венедиктов

Deputy Health Minister of the Soviet Union
- In office 1965–1981
- Minister: Boris Petrovsky; Sergei Burenkov
- Leader: Leonid Brezhnev

Personal details
- Born: Dimitri Dmitrievich Venediktov; June 8, 1929 Moscow, Soviet Union
- Died: March 27, 2021 (aged 91) Moscow, Russia
- Party: CPSU
- Spouse: Maria Grigorievna Pavlova
- Education: Medicine
- Alma mater: First Moscow State Medical University
- Other offices held: 1989–1991: People's Deputy of the Congress of People's Deputies of the Soviet Union

Dimitri Dmitrievich Venediktov (Russian: Дмитрий Дмитриевич Венедиктов; June 8, 1929 – March 27, 2021) was a Soviet and Russian politician who was the Deputy Health Minister of the USSR from 1965 to 1981 under Ministers of Health Boris Petrovsky and Sergei Burenkov. In this role, he was instrumental in the campaign to eradicate smallpox and supplying vaccines for the program He was also involved in organizing the Conference of Alma-Ata which was foundational in the field of public health. He was elected to the Congress of People's Deputies of the Soviet Union from 1989 to its dissolution. He later served on the Russian Academy of Medical Sciences, focusing on information storage in healthcare. Venediktov died in Moscow on March 27, 2021, at the age of 91.

== Awards ==
Venediktov received two Orders of the Red Banner of Labour and one Order of the Badge of Honour amongst other awards.
