= Healthy city =

Concept in urban design for health

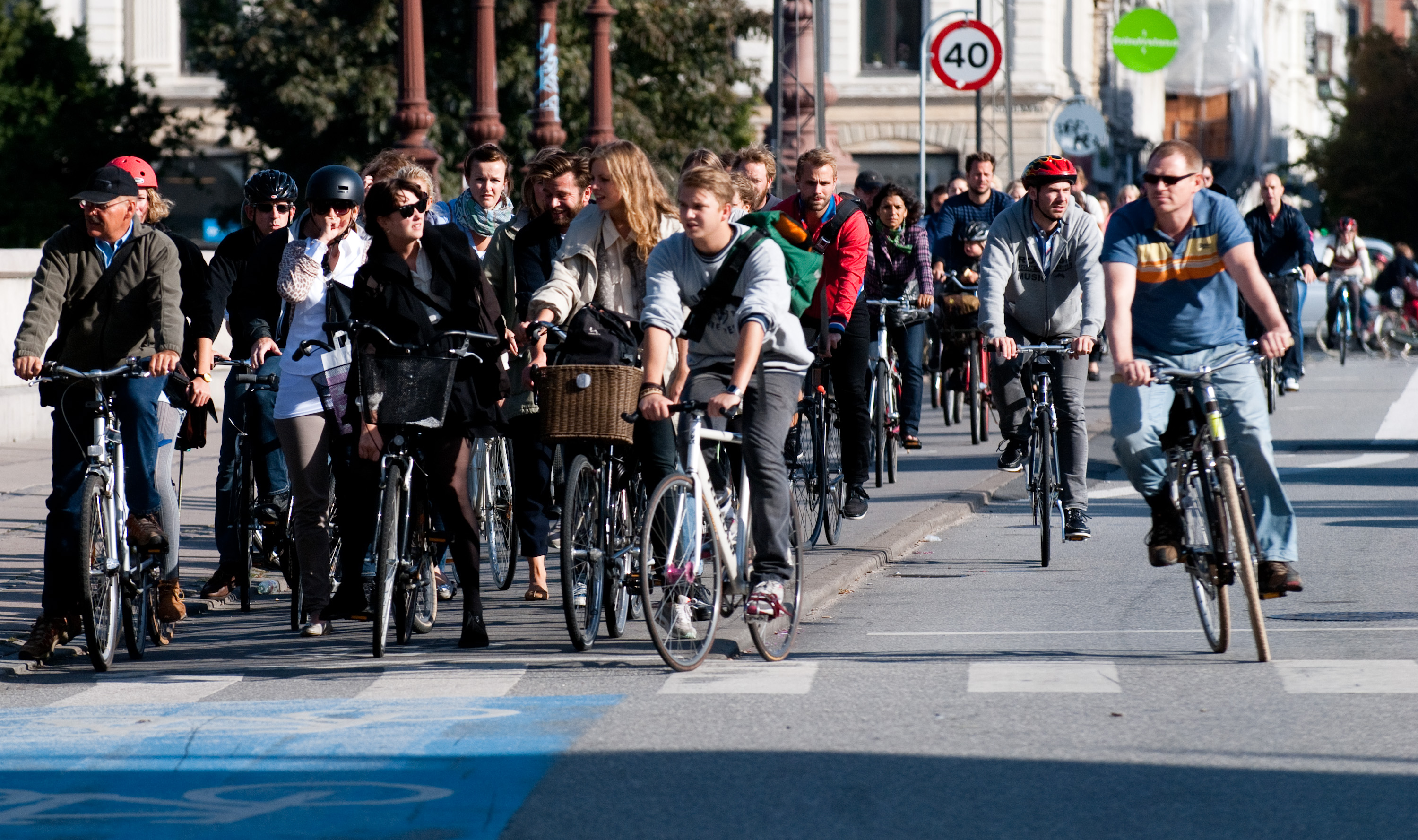
Rush hour in Copenhagen, where 62% of the population commute by bicycle to their work or study places each day

Healthy city is a term used in public health and urban design to stress the impact of policy on human health. It is a municipality that continually improves on a physical and a social level until environmental and pathological conditions are reached establishing an acceptable morbidity rate for the population. Its modern form derives from a World Health Organization (WHO) initiative on Healthy Cities and Villages in 1986, but has a history dating back to the mid 19th century. The term was developed in conjunction with the European Union, but rapidly became international as a way of establishing healthy public policy at the local level through health promotion. It emphasises the multi-dimensionality of health as laid out in WHO's constitution and, more recently, the Ottawa Charter for Health Promotion. An alternative term is Healthy Communities, or Municipios saludables in parts of Latin America.

== Approaches ==
Many jurisdictions which have healthy community programmes and cities can apply to become a WHO-designated "Healthy City". WHO defines the Healthy City as:

"one that is continually creating and improving those physical and social environments and expanding those community resources which enable people to mutually support each other in performing all the functions of life and in developing to their maximum potential."

Measuring the indices required, establishing standards and determining the impact of each component on health is difficult. In some regions such as Europe, a health impact assessment is a required piece of public policy development.

There are many networks of healthy cities, including in Europe and internationally, such as the Alliance for Healthy Cities. A key feature is ensuring that the social determinants of health are taken into consideration in urban design and urban governance. For example, "urbanization and health" was the theme of the 2010 World Health Day. One tool in developing healthy cities is social entrepreneurship.

== Principles ==
Healthy cities are understood as an ongoing process rather than a fixed outcome. The World Health Organization (WHO) describes a healthy city as one that continually improves its physical and social environments and expands community resources so that people can support one another and develop to their full potential. Key principles of the healthy cities approach include equity, participatory governance, intersectoral collaboration, and action on the social determinants of health.

== Healthy cities and health equity ==
The healthy city concept is closely linked to health equity and the social determinants of health. These determinants include the conditions in which people are born, grow, live, work, and age, as well as access to resources and opportunities. Addressing these factors is essential for reducing health disparities and improving overall population health. Healthy city initiatives often focus on urban planning, access to services, community participation, and inclusive governance to promote well-being.

== See also ==
- 15-minute city
- Active design
- Carfree city
- Co-benefits of climate change mitigation
- Health promotion
  - Alliance for Healthy Cities
- Health impact assessment – Type of public health document
- Health impact of light rail systems
- Most livable cities
- Primary health care
  - Health For All
- Public health
- Sustainable city – City designed with consideration for social, economic, and environmental impact
- Social influences on fitness behavior
- Street reclamation – Changing streets to focus on non-car use
- Urban vitality
- Zero-carbon city
