= Declaration of Alma-Ata =

1978 declaration on primary health care

Declaration of Alma-Ata was adopted at the International Conference on Primary Health Care (PHC), which was jointly convened by WHO and UNICEF and held on 6–12 September 1978 in Almaty, Kazakhstan (then Alma-Ata, Kazakh Soviet Socialist Republic). It expressed the need for urgent action by all governments, all health and development workers, and the world community to protect and promote the health of all people. It was the first international declaration underlining the importance of primary health care. The primary health care approach has since then been accepted by member countries of the World Health Organization (WHO) as the key to achieving the goal of "Health For All", but only in developing countries at first. This applied to all other countries five years later. The Alma-Ata Declaration of 1978 emerged as a major milestone of the twentieth century in the field of public health, and it identified primary health care as the key to the attainment of the goal of "Health For All" around the globe.

== Description ==
The conference called for urgent and effective national and international action to develop and implement primary health care throughout the world and particularly in developing countries in a spirit of technical cooperation and in keeping with a New International Economic Order. The sentiment of the declaration was partly inspired by the barefoot doctor system in China, which revolutionized the state of primary care in China's rural areas. The declaration urged governments, the WHO, UNICEF, and other international organizations, as well as multilateral and bilateral agencies, non-governmental organizations, funding agencies, all health workers and the world community to support national and international commitment to primary health care and to channel increased technical and financial support to it, particularly in developing countries. The conference called on the aforementioned to collaborate in introducing, developing and maintaining primary health care in accordance with the spirit and content of the declaration. The declaration has 10 points and is non-binding on member states.

=== Definition of health ===
The first section of the declaration reaffirms the WHO definition of health as "a state of complete physical, mental and social well-being and not merely the absence of disease or infirmity". The definition seeks to include social and economic sectors within the scope of attaining health and reaffirms health as a human right.

=== Equality ===
The declaration highlighted the inequality of health status between the developed and the developing countries and termed it politically, socially and economically unacceptable.

=== Health as a socio-economic issue and as a human right ===
The third section called for economic and social development as a pre-requisite to the attainment of health for all. It also declared positive effects on economic and social development and on world peace through promotion and protection of the health of the people.

Participation of people as a group or individually in planning and implementing their health care was declared as a human right and duty.

=== Role of the state ===
This section emphasized on the role of the state in providing adequate health and social measures. This section enunciated the call for "Health For All" which became a campaign of the WHO in the coming years. It defined Health for All as the attainment by all peoples of the world by the year 2000 of a level of health that will permit them to lead a socially and economically productive life. The declaration urged governments, international organizations and the whole world community to take this up as a main social target in the spirit of social justice.

=== Primary health care and components ===
This section defined primary health care and urged signatories to incorporate the concept of primary health care in their health systems. Primary health care has since been adopted by many member nations. More recently, Margaret Chan, the Director-General of the WHO has reaffirmed the primary health care approach as the most efficient and cost-effective way to organize a health system. She also pointed out that international evidence overwhelmingly demonstrates that health systems oriented toward primary health care produce better outcomes, at lower costs, and with higher user satisfaction.

The seventh section lists the components of primary health care. The next two sections called on all governments to incorporate primary health care approach in their health systems and urged international cooperation in better use of the world's resources.

== Criticisms of and reactions to the Alma-Ata Declaration ==
The Alma-Ata Declaration generated numerous criticisms and reactions worldwide. Many argued that the slogan "Health for All by 2000" was not possible and that the declaration did not have clear targets. In his article "The Origins of Primary Health Care and Selective Primary Health Care", Marcos Cueto claims that the declaration was condemned as being unrealistic, idealistic, and too broad. As a result of these criticisms, the Rockefeller Foundation sponsored the Health and Population Development Conference held in Italy at the Bellagio Conference Center in 1979 (a year after Alma-Ata). The purpose of this conference was to specify the goals of PHC and to achieve more effective strategies.

As a result, Selective Primary Health Care (PHC) was introduced. As opposed to PHC of the Alma-Ata Declaration, Selective PHC presented the idea of obtaining low-cost solutions to very specific and common causes of death. The targets and effects of Selective PHC were clear, concise, measurable, and easy to observe. This is because Selective PHC had explicit areas of focus that were believed to be the most important. They were known as GOBI (growth monitoring, oral rehydration treatment, breastfeeding, and immunization), and later GOBI-FFF (adding food supplementation, female literacy, and family planning). Unlike the Alma-Ata Declaration, these aspects were very specific and concise, making global health as successful and attainable as possible. Nonetheless, there were still many supporters who preferred the comprehensive PHC introduced at Alma-Ata over Selective PHC, criticizing the latter as a misrepresentation of some core principles of the original declaration. The main critics are toward selective care as a restrictive approach to health. Therefore, such approach to primary care does not contribute toward integral care (globality) and does not address social determinants as a fundamental aspect of illness and thus essential to health care planning.

== Legacy ==
The World Health Organization, UNICEF and the Government of Kazakhstan co-hosted the Global Conference on Primary Health Care in Astana on 25–26 October 2018. The conference marked the 40th anniversary of the Alma-Ata Declaration, and united world leaders to affirm that strong primary health care is essential to achieve universal health coverage. The conference resulted in the adoption of the Astana Declaration on Primary Health Care that reaffirmed and extended the Alma-Ata Declaration.

== See also ==
- Alliance for Healthy Cities
- Global health
- Health policy
- Millennium Development Goals
- Primary health care
- Public health
- Right to health
- Sustainable Development Goals
- World Health Organization
- Dimitri Venediktov
