= Health For All =

Programming goal of the World Health Organization

Health For All is a goal of the World Health Organization (WHO), that has been popularized since the 1970s, which envisions securing the health and well being of people around the world. It is the basis for the World Health Organization's primary health care strategy to promote health, human dignity, and enhance quality of life.

== Definition ==
Halfdan Mahler, Director General (1973–1983) of the WHO, defined Health For All in 1981, as follows:

Health For All means that health is to be brought within reach of everyone in a given country. And by "health" is meant a personal state of well being, not just the availability of health services – a state of health that enables a person to lead a socially and economically productive life. Health For All implies the removal of the obstacles to health – that is to say, the elimination of malnutrition, ignorance, contaminated drinking water and unhygienic housing – quite as much as it does the solution of purely medical problems such as a lack of doctors, hospital beds, drugs and vaccines.

- Health For All means that health should be regarded as an objective of economic development and not merely as one of the means of attaining it.
- Health For All demands, ultimately, literacy for all. Until this becomes reality it demands at least the beginning of an understanding of what health means for every individual.
- Health For All depends on continued progress in medical care and public health. The health services must be accessible to all through primary health care, in which basic medical help is available in every village, backed up by referral services to more specialised care. Immunisation must similarly achieve universal coverage.
- Health For All is thus a holistic concept calling for efforts in agriculture, industry, education, housing, and communications, just as much as in medicine and public health. Medical care alone cannot bring health to in hovels. Health for such people requires a whole new way of life and fresh opportunities to provide themselves with a higher standard of living.

The adoption of Health For All by government, implies a commitment to promote the advancement of all citizens on a broad front of development and a resolution to encourage the individual citizen to achieve a higher quality of life.

The rate of progress will depend on the political will. The World Health Assembly believes that, given a high degree of determination, Health For All could be attained by the year 2000. That target date is a challenge to all WHO's Member States.

The basis of the Health For All strategy is primary health care.

Two decades later, WHO Director General Lee Jong-wook (2003–2006) reaffirmed the concept in the World Health Report 2003:

Health for all became the slogan for a movement. It was not just an ideal but an organizing principle: everybody needs and is entitled to the highest possible standard of health. The principles remain indispensable for a coherent vision of global health. Turning that vision into reality calls for clarity both on the possibilities and on the obstacles that have slowed and in some cases reversed progress towards meeting the health needs of all people. We have a real opportunity now to make progress that will mean longer, healthier lives for millions of people, turn despair into realistic hope, and lay the foundations for improved health for generations to come.

== See also ==
- Alma Ata Declaration
- Ottawa Charter for Health Promotion
- Health 21
- Healthy city
- Millennium Development Goals
- Right to health
