= Ottawa Charter for Health Promotion =

International agreement signed at the First International Conference on Health Promotion

The flag of the World Health Organization

The Ottawa Charter for Health Promotion is the name of an international agreement signed at the First International Conference on Health Promotion, organized by the World Health Organization (WHO) and held in Ottawa, Canada, in November 1986. It launched a series of actions among international organizations, national governments and local communities to achieve the goal of "Health For All" by the year 2000 and beyond through better health promotion.

== Context ==
The thirtieth WHO World Health Assembly, held in 1977, had highlighted the importance of promoting health so that all the international citizens had an "economically productive" level of health by the year 2000. Further, a localised European taskforce developed a strategy for health promotion in the WHO European Region.

In the context of this charter, the concept of 'health' is particular. It covers the extent to which a group or individual can fulfil their ambitions and needs, on the one hand, and evolve with or adapt to the environment, on the other. Health is thus seen as a resource for everyday life, not as the goal of life; it is a positive concept that emphasises social and individual resources as well as physical capabilities. Thus, health promotion is not just a health issue, but goes beyond healthy lifestyles to well-being.

== Action areas of the Ottawa Charter ==
=== Prerequisites ===
The fundamental conditions and resources for health are:

- peace,
- shelter,
- education,
- food,
- income,
- a stable eco-system,
- sustainable resources,
- social justice, and equity.

=== Action areas ===
Five action areas for health promotion were identified in the charter:

1. Building healthy public policy
2. Creating supportive environments
3. Strengthening community action
4. Developing personal skills
5. Re-orienting health care services toward prevention of illness and promotion of health

The basic strategies for health promotion were prioritized as:

- Advocate: Health is a resource for social and developmental means, thus the dimensions that affect these factors must be changed to encourage health.
- Enable: Health equity must be reached where individuals must become empowered to control the determinants that affect their health, such that they are able to reach the highest attainable quality of life.
- Mediation: Health promotion cannot be achieved by the health sector alone; rather its success will depend on the collaboration of all sectors of government (social, economic, etc.) as well as independent organizations (media, industry, etc.).

== Developments after Ottawa ==
Internationally:

- WHO: Jakarta Declaration in 1997
- WHO: Health for all targets in 1997
- WHO: Health 21 in 1999
- WHO: Bangkok Charter in 2005
- WHO: 7th Global Conference on Health Promotion 2009
- WHO: 8th Global Conference on Health Promotion 2013

Within countries:

- United Kingdom
  - Our Healthier Nation
  - National Plan

Decades later, this charter is still considered a seminal document and template for health promotion.

The 40th anniversary of the charter was marked by a special issue of the journal Health Promotion International. Articles included a review of health equity frameworks in Australia and a practical application of the charter addressing health inequalities in the UK.

== See also ==
- Health promotion
  - Health For All
  - Royal Society for the Promotion of Health, United Kingdom
  - Ministry of Health Promotion and Sport (Ontario), Canada
- Health policy
- Health departments
- Healthy city
  - Alliance for Healthy Cities
- World Health Organization
