= Health promotion =

Process of enabling people to increase control over, and to improve, their health

Health promotion is, as stated in the 1986 World Health Organization (WHO) Ottawa Charter for Health Promotion, the "process of enabling people to increase control over, and to improve their health".

== Scope ==
The WHO's 1986 Ottawa Charter for Health Promotion and then the 2005 Bangkok Charter for Health Promotion in a Globalized World defines health promotion as "the process of enabling people to increase control over their health and its determinants, and thereby improve their health".

Health promotion involves public policy that addresses health determinants such as income, housing, food security, employment, and quality working conditions. More recent work has used the term Health in All Policies (HiAP) to refer to the actions that incorporate health into all public policies. Health promotion is aligned with health equity and can be a focus of non-governmental organizations (NGOs) dedicated to social justice or human rights. Health literacy can be developed in schools, while aspects of health promotion such as breastfeeding promotion can depend on laws and rules of public spaces. One of the Ottawa Charter Health Promotion Action items is infusing prevention into all sectors of society, to that end, it is seen in preventive healthcare rather than a treatment and curative care focused medical model.

There is a tendency among some public health officials, governments, and the medical–industrial complex to reduce health promotion to just developing personal skills, also known as health education and social marketing focused on changing behavioral risk factors. However, recent evidence suggests that attitudes about public health policies are less about personal abilities or health messaging than about individuals' philosophical beliefs about morality, politics, and science.

== History ==
This first publication of health promotion is from the 1974 Lalonde report from the Government of Canada, which contained a health promotion strategy "aimed at informing, influencing and assisting both individuals and organizations so that they will accept more responsibility and be more active in matters affecting mental and physical health". Another predecessor of the definition was the 1979 Healthy People report of the Surgeon General of the United States, which noted that health promotion "seeks the development of community and individual measures which can help... [people] to develop lifestyles that can maintain and enhance the state of well-being".

At least two publications led to a "broad empowerment/environmental" definition of health promotion in the mid-1980s:

- In the year 1984 the WHO Regional Office for Europe defined health promotion as "the process of enabling people to increase control over, and to improve, their health". In addition to methods to change lifestyles, the WHO Regional Office advocated "legislation, fiscal measures, organizational change, community development and spontaneous local activities against health hazards" as health promotion methods.
- In 1986, Jake Epp, Canadian Minister of National Health and Welfare, released Achieving health for all: a framework for health promotion which also came to be known as the "Epp report". This report defined the three "mechanisms" of health promotion as "self-care"; "mutual aid, or the actions people take to help each other cope"; and "healthy environments".
- 1st International Conference on Health Promotion, Ottawa, 1986, which resulted in the "Ottawa Charter for Health Promotion". According to the Ottawa Charter, health promotion:
  - "is not just the responsibility of the health sector, but goes beyond healthy life-styles to well-being"
  - "aims at making... [political, economic, social, cultural, environmental, behavioural and biological factors] favourable through advocacy for health"
  - "focuses on achieving equity in health"
  - "demands coordinated action by all concerned: by governments, by health and other social organizations."

The "American" definition of health promotion, first promulgated by the American Journal of Health Promotion in the late 1980s, focuses more on the delivery of services with a bio-behavioral approach rather than environmental support using a settings approach. Later the power on the environment over behavior was incorporated. The Health Promotion Glossary 2021 reinforces the international 1986 definition.

The WHO, in collaboration with other organizations, has subsequently co-sponsored international conferences including the 2015 Okanagan Charter on Health Promotion Universities and Colleges.

In November 2019, researchers reported, based on an international study of 27 countries, that caring for families is the main motivator for people worldwide.

== Settings-Based Approach ==
The WHO's settings approach to health promotion, Healthy Settings, looks at the settings as individual systems that link community participation, equity, empowerment, and partnership to actions that promote health. According to the WHO, a setting is "the place or social context in which people engage in daily activities in which environmental, organizational, and personal factors interact to affect health and wellbeing." There are 11 recognized settings in this approach: cities, villages, municipalities and communities, schools, workplaces, markets, homes, islands, hospitals, prisons, and universities.

=== Health Promoting Hospitals ===
Health promotion in the hospital setting aims to increase health gain by supporting the health of patients, staff, and the community. This is achieved by integrating health promotion concepts, strategies, and values into the culture and organizational structure of the hospital. Specifically, this means setting up a management structure, involving medical and non-medical staff in health promotion communication, devising action plans for health promotion policies and projects, and measuring and measuring health outcomes and impact for staff, patients, and the community.

The International Network of Health Promoting Hospitals and Health Services is the official, international network for the promotion and dissemination of principles, standards, and recommendations for health promotion in the hospital and health services settings.

=== Workplace Setting ===
The process of health promotion works in all settings and sectors where people live, work, play and love. A common setting is the workplace. The focus of health on the work site is that of prevention and the intervention that reduces the health risks of the employee. In 1996, the U.S. Public Health Service issued a report titled "Physical Activity and Health: A Report of the Surgeon General" that provided a comprehensive review of the available scientific evidence about the relationship between physical activity and an individual's health status at that time. The report showed that over 60% of Americans were not regularly active and that 25% are not active at all. There is very strong evidence linking physical activity to numerous health improvements. Health promotion can be performed in various locations. Among the settings that have received special attention are the community, health care facilities, schools, and worksites. Worksite health promotion, also known by terms such as "workplace health promotion", has been defined as "the combined efforts of employers, employees and society to improve the health and well-being of people at work". WHO states that the workplace "has been established as one of the priority settings for health promotion into the 21st century" because it influences "physical, mental, economic and social well-being" and "offers an ideal setting and infrastructure to support the promotion of health of a large audience".

Worksite health promotion programs (also called "workplace health promotion programs", "worksite wellness programs", or "workplace wellness programs") include adequate sleep, cooking classes, exercise, nutrition, physical activity, smoking cessation, stress management, and, weight loss.

According to the Centers for Disease Control and Prevention (CDC), "Regular physical activity is one of the most effective disease prevention behaviors." Physical activity programs reduce feelings of anxiety and depression, reduce obesity (especially when combined with an improved diet), reduce risk of chronic diseases including cardiovascular disease, high blood pressure, and type 2 diabetes; and finally improve stamina, strength, and energy.

Reviews and meta-analyses published between 2005 and 2008 that examined the scientific literature on worksite health promotion programs include the following:

- A review of 13 studies published through January 2004 showed "strong evidence... for an effect on dietary intake, inconclusive evidence for an effect on physical activity, and no evidence for an effect on health risk indicators".
- In the most recent of a series of updates to a review of "comprehensive health promotion and disease management programs at the worksite," Pelletier (2005) noted "positive clinical and cost outcomes" but also found declines in the number of relevant studies and their quality.
- A "meta-evaluation" of 56 studies published 1982–2005 found that worksite health promotion produced on average a decrease of 26.8% in sick leave absenteeism, a decrease of 26.1% in health costs, a decrease of 32% in workers' compensation costs and disability management claims costs, and a cost-benefit ratio of 5.81.
- A meta-analysis of 46 studies published in 1970–2005 found moderate, statistically significant effects of work health promotion, especially exercise, on "work ability" and "overall well-being"; furthermore, "sickness absences seem to be reduced by activities promoting a healthy lifestyle".
- A meta-analysis of 22 studies published 1997–2007 determined that workplace health promotion interventions led to "small" reductions in depression and anxiety.
- A review of 119 studies suggested that successful work site health-promotion programs have attributes such as: assessing employees' health needs and tailoring programs to meet those needs; attaining high participation rates; promoting self care; targeting several health issues simultaneously; and offering different types of activities (e.g., group sessions as well as printed materials).

A study conducted by the World Health Organization and the International Labour Organization found that exposure to long working hours is the occupational risk factor with the largest attributable burden of disease, i.e. an estimated 745,000 fatalities from ischemic heart disease and stroke events in 2016. This landmark study established a new global policy argument and agenda for health promotion on psychosocial risk factors (including psychosocial stress) in the workplace setting.

== See also ==
- Breastfeeding promotion
- DISCERN, an consume tool to measure the quality of written health information
- Health 21
- Health for all
- Health policy
- Health promoting hospitals
- Health promotion in higher education
- Preventive healthcare
- Right to health
