= Healthy community design =

Urban planning to facilitate healthy lifestyles

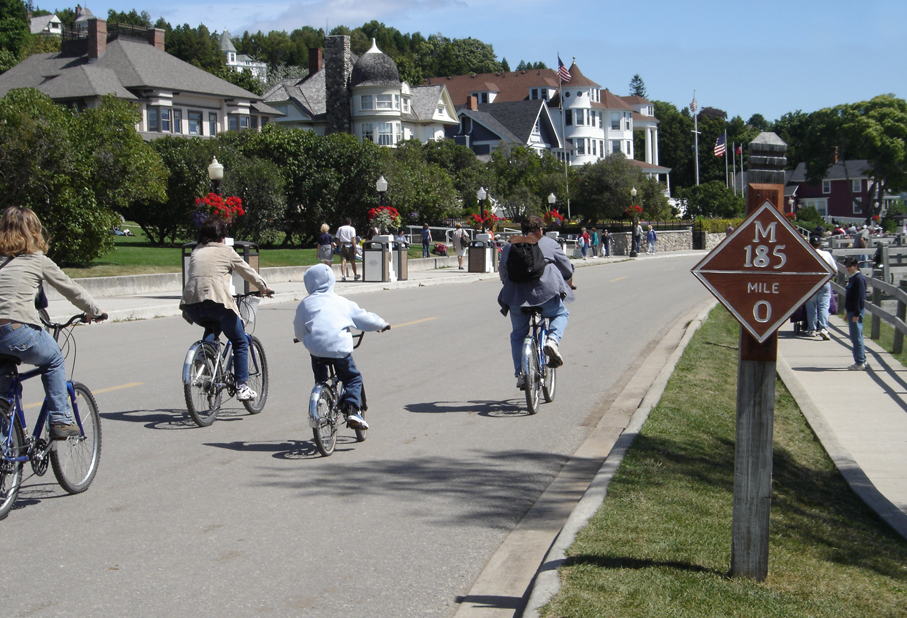
Mackinac Island, car-free since 1898

Healthy community design is planning and designing communities that make it easier for people to live healthy lives. Healthy community design offers important benefits:

- Decreases dependence on the automobile by building homes, businesses, schools, churches and parks closer to each other so that people can more easily walk or bike between them.
- Provides opportunities for people to be physically active and socially engaged as part of their daily routine, improving the physical and mental health of its citizens.
- Allows persons, if they choose, to age in place and remain all their lives in a community that reflects their changing lifestyles and changing physical capabilities.

== Health benefits ==
Healthy places are those designed and built to improve the quality of life for all people who live, work, learn, and play within their borders—person is free to make choices amid a variety of healthy, available, accessible, and affordable options.

Healthy community design can provide many advantages:

- Promote physical activity
- Promote a diet free of additives, preservatives, and pesticides
- Improve air quality
- Lower risk of injuries
- Increase social connection and sense of community
- Reduce contributions to climate change

== Principles ==
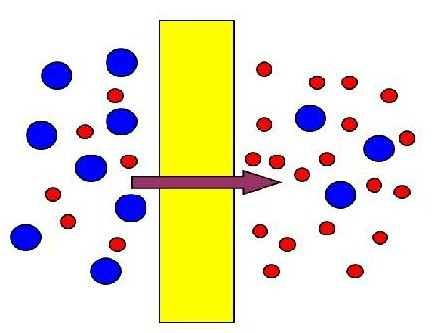
Membrane diagram resembling high traffic street.

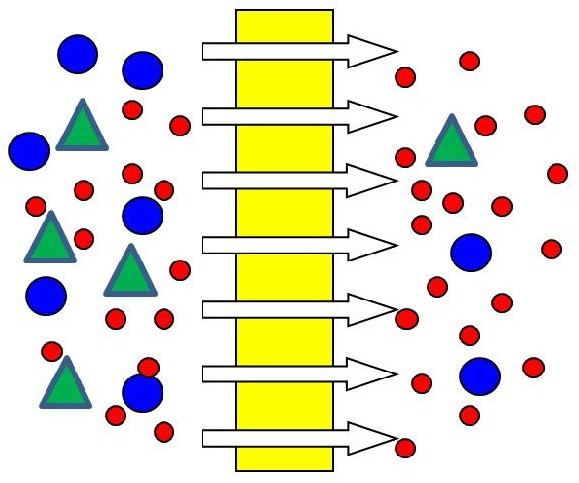
Membrane diagram resembling low traffic street.

- Encourage mixed land use and greater land density to shorten distances between homes, workplaces, schools and recreation so people can walk or bike more easily to them.
- Provide good mass transit to reduce the dependence upon automobiles. Build good pedestrian and bicycle infrastructure, including sidewalks and bike paths that are safely removed from automobile traffic as well as good right of way laws and clear, easy-to-follow signage.
- Ensure affordable housing is available for people of all income levels.
- Create community centers where people can gather and mingle as part of their daily activities.
- Offer access to green space and parks.

== See also ==
- 15-minute city – Urban accessibility concept
- Active design – Building and planning promoting physical activity
- Active living – Physically active way of life
- Complete Communities – Planning meeting needs of all residents
- Complete streets – Transportation policy and design approach
- Healthy city – Concept in urban design for health
- Health impact assessment – Type of public health document
- Health impact of light rail
- Human-powered transport – Transport of goods and/or people only using human muscles
- Most livable cities
- Obesity and the environment – Environmental factors affecting the incidence of obesity
- Public interest design
- Smart growth – Urban planning philosophy
- Social influences on fitness behavior – Effect on physical activity
- Social determinants of obesity
- Transit-oriented development – Urban planning prioritising transit
- Urban vitality
