= Sedentary lifestyle =

Type of lifestyle involving little to no physical activity

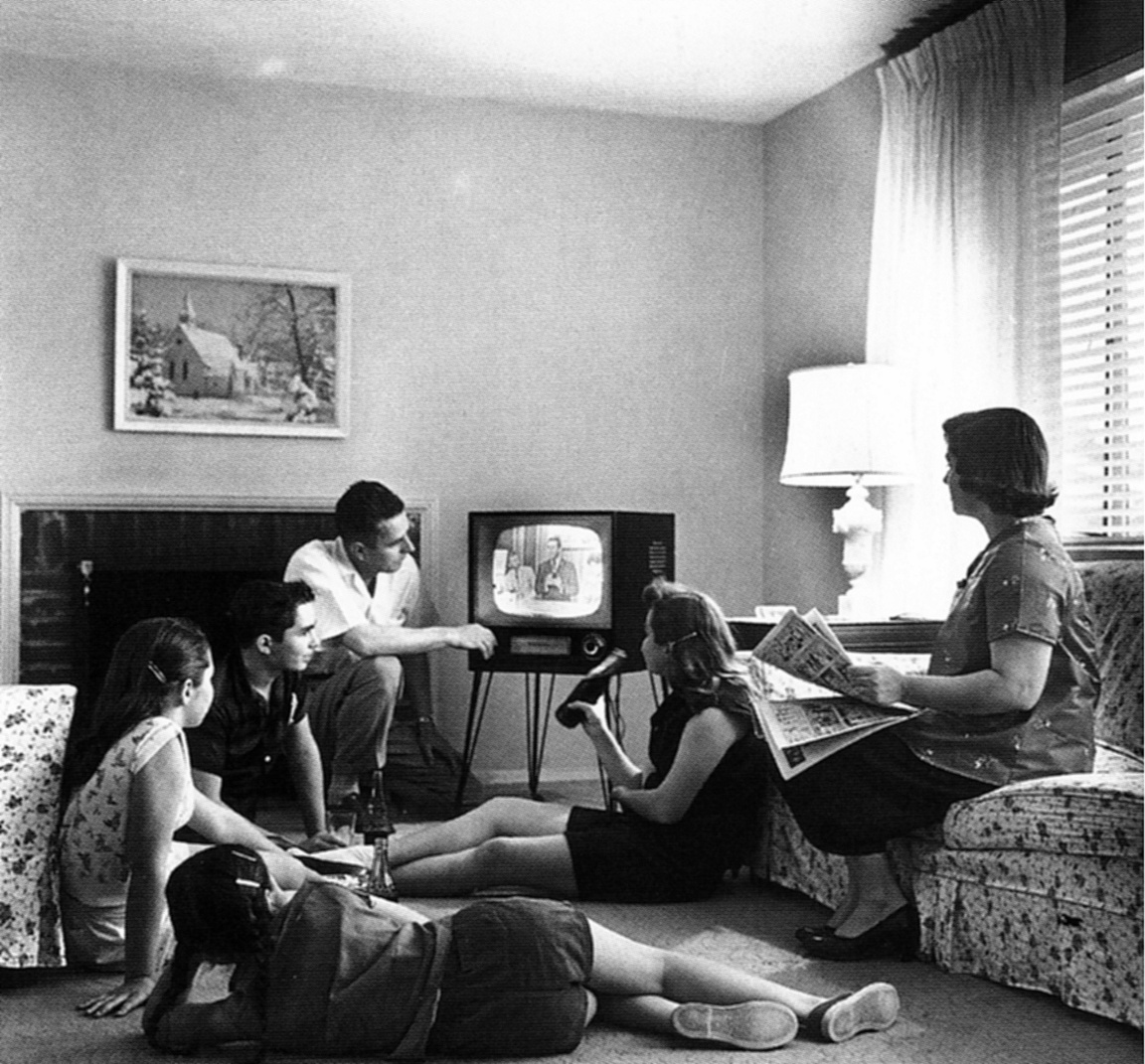
Watching television is a common characteristic of a sedentary lifestyle.

Sedentary lifestyle is a lifestyle type, in which one is physically inactive and does little or no physical movement and/or exercise. A person living a sedentary lifestyle is often sitting or lying down while engaged in an activity like socializing, watching TV, playing video games, reading or using a mobile phone or computer for much of the day. A sedentary lifestyle contributes to poor health quality, diseases as well as many preventable causes of death.

Sitting time is a common measure of a sedentary lifestyle. A global review representing 47% of the global adult population found that the average person sits down for 4.7 to 6.5 hours a day with the average going up every year.

Screen time is a term for the amount of time a person spends looking at a screen such as a television, computer monitor, or mobile device. Excessive screen time is linked to negative health consequences.

== Definition ==
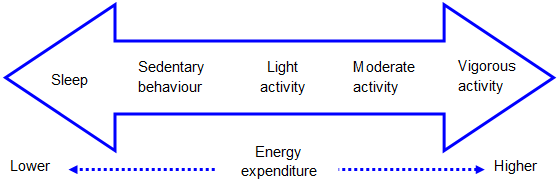
Sedentary behavior enables less energy expenditure than active behavior.

Sedentary behavior is not the same as physical inactivity: sedentary behavior is defined as "any waking behavior characterized by an energy expenditure less than or equal to 1.5 metabolic equivalents (METs), while in a sitting, reclining or lying posture". Spending most waking hours sitting does not necessarily mean that an individual is sedentary, though sitting and lying down most frequently are sedentary behaviors. Esmonde-White defines a sedentary lifestyle as a lifestyle that involves "longer than six hours a day" of sedentary behavior.

== Health effects ==
Death rates due to low physical activity

Effects of a sedentary work life or lifestyle can be either direct or indirect. One of the most prominent direct effect of a sedentary lifestyle is an increased body mass index (BMI) leading to obesity. A 2006 report indicated that a 5% increase in a community's walkability index was associated with a 32% increase in time spent walking or biking and a 0.23-point reduction in BMI.

A country-level study examining the global cost of disease and its associated risk factors identified obesity as a top-seven risk factor associated with attributable death and a top-eight risk factor associated with attributable disease burden. Obesity was a top-three risk factor for high-income countries.

At least 300,000 premature deaths, and $90 billion in direct healthcare costs are caused by obesity and sedentary lifestyle per year in the US alone. The risk is higher among those that sit still more than five hours per day. It is shown to be a risk factor on its own independent of hard exercise and BMI. People that sit still more than four hours per day have a 40 percent higher risk than those that sit fewer than four hours per day. However, those that exercise at least four hours per week are as healthy as those that sit fewer than four hours per day.

Indirectly, an increased BMI due to a sedentary lifestyle can lead to decreased productivity and increased absenteeism from necessary activities like work.

A sedentary lifestyle contributes to or can be a risk factor for:

- Anxiety

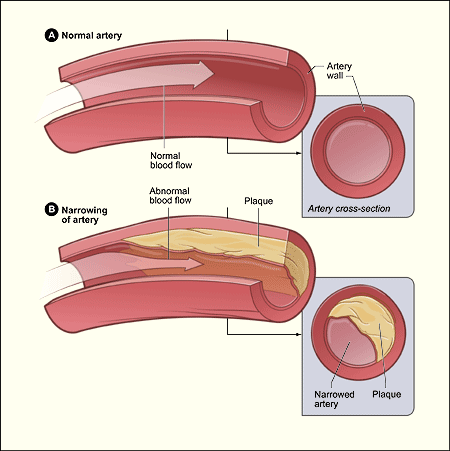
Atherosclerosis

- Cardiovascular disease
- Breast cancer
- Colon cancer
- Depression
- High blood pressure
- Lipid disorders
- Mortality in adults
- Obesity
- Osteoporosis
- Scoliosis
- Spinal disc herniation (low back pain)
- Type 2 diabetes
- Weight gain

== Mitigation ==
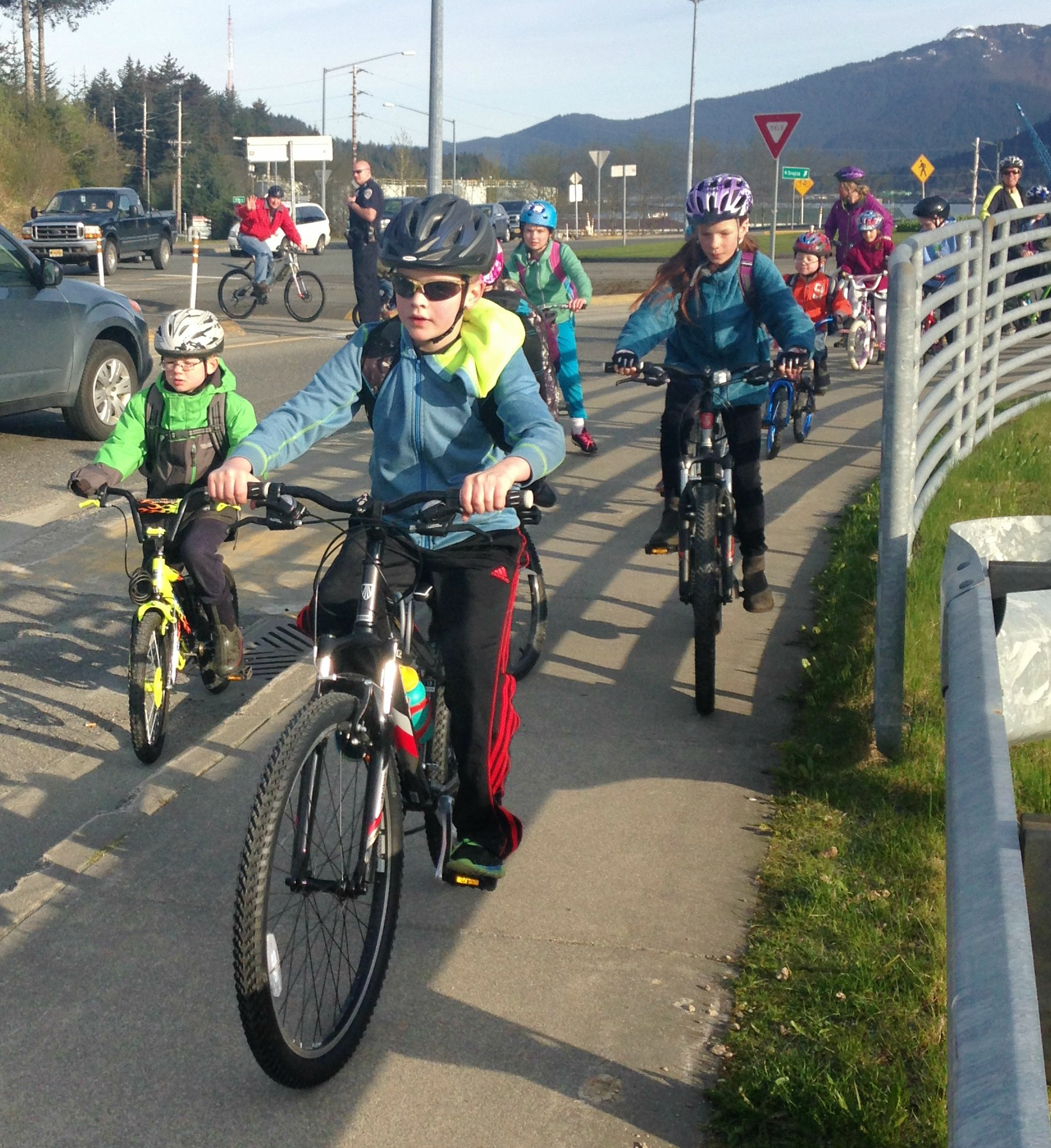
Gastineau Elementary Bike to School Day in Alaska, 2015

Adults and children spend long amounts of time sitting in a workplace or at a school, which is why interventions have been focused in these two areas. Mass media campaigns might also be able to reduce the amount of time spent sitting or lying down and positively affect the intention to be active physically.

Recent innovations in AI technology have led to the development of exercise prescription systems designed to reduce sedentary behavior. These systems deliver personalized exercise plans by analyzing individual health metrics, potentially decreasing the prevalence of a sedentary lifestyle and its associated health risks.

=== In urban spaces ===
Some evidence has been found of a negative association between exposure to an existing urban motorway and moderate to vigorous physical activity. The proportion of physically active individuals was higher in high- versus low-walkability neighborhoods. Rising rates of being overweight, obesity, and physical inactivity in China's rapidly growing cities and urban populations have been due to urban development practices and policies.

=== In a work environment ===
Occupational sedentary behaviour accounts for a significant proportion of sitting time for many adults. Some workplaces have implemented exercise classes at lunch, walking challenges among coworkers, or allowing employees to stand rather than sit at their desks during work. Workplace interventions such as alternative activity workstations, sit-stand desks, and promotion of stair use are among measures implemented to counter the harms of a sedentary workplace.

==== Research ====
A 2018 Cochrane review concluded that "At present there is low‐quality evidence that sit‐stand desks may reduce sitting at work in the first year of their use. However, the effects are likely to reduce with time. There is generally insufficient evidence to draw conclusions about such effects for other types of interventions and for the effectiveness of reducing workplace sitting over periods longer than one year."

An intervention to encourage office workers to stand and move reduced their sitting time by 22 minutes after 1 year; the effect was 3-times greater when the intervention included a sit-to-stand desk. The intervention also led to small improvements in stress, wellbeing and vigor.

=== In education ===
The majority of time children are in a classroom, they are seated (60% of the time). Children who regularly engage in physical activity are more likely to become healthy adults; children benefit both physically and mentally when they replace sedentary behavior with active behavior. Despite this knowledge and due in part to an increase in sedentary behaviors, as of 2018 children have 8 fewer hours of free play each week than they did 20 years before.

Several studies have examined the effects of adding height-adjustable standing desks to classrooms, which have reduced the time spent sitting. However, associating the reduction in sitting with health effects is challenging. In one study conducted on Australian school children, known as the Transform-Us! study, interventions reduced the amount of time children spent sitting in the classroom, which was associated with lower body mass index and waist circumference. The interventions used in the study included stand-up desks and easels, the use of timers, and sport and circus equipment in the classroom. Teachers also made lessons more active, and added breaks to lessons to promote active time. In the US, another intervention for children is promoting the use of active transportation to and from school, such as through the Safe Routes to School program.

== History ==
Over the last hundred years, there has been a large shift from manual labor jobs (e.g. farming, manufacturing, building) to office jobs which is due to many contributing factors including globalization, outsourcing of jobs and technological advances (specifically internet and computers). In 1960, there was a decline of jobs requiring moderate physical activity from 50% to 20%, and one in two Americans had a physically demanding job, while in 2011 this ratio was one in five. From 1990 to 2016, there was a decrease of about one third in manual labor jobs/employment. In 2008, the United States American National Health Interview Survey found that 36% of adults were inactive, and 59% of adult respondents never participated in vigorous physical activity lasting more than 10 minutes per week.

According to a 2018 study, office based workers typically spend 70–85% sitting. In the US population, prevalence of sitting watching television or videos at least 2 h/d was high in 2015–2016 (ranging from 59% to 65%); the estimated prevalence of computer use outside school or work for at least 1 h/d increased from 2001 to 2016 (from 43% to 56% for children, from 53% to 57% among adolescents, and from 29% to 50% for adults); and estimated total sitting time increased from 2007 to 2016 (from 7.0 to 8.2 h/d among adolescents and from 5.5 to 6.4 h/d among adults).

== See also ==
- Active design
- Active lifestyle
- Active mobility
- Car dependency
- Childhood obesity
- Couch potato
- Cyclability
- Cycling advocacy
- Effects of cars
- Effects of the car on societies
- Exercise trends
- Exercise
- Green exercise
- Healthy city
- Lack of physical education
- Laziness
- Neurobiological effects of physical exercise
- Obesity and walking
- Physical activity
- Preventable causes of death
- Simple living
- Societal effects of cars
- Street reclamation
- Walkability
- Walking audit
- Workaholic
