= Active living =

Physically active way of life

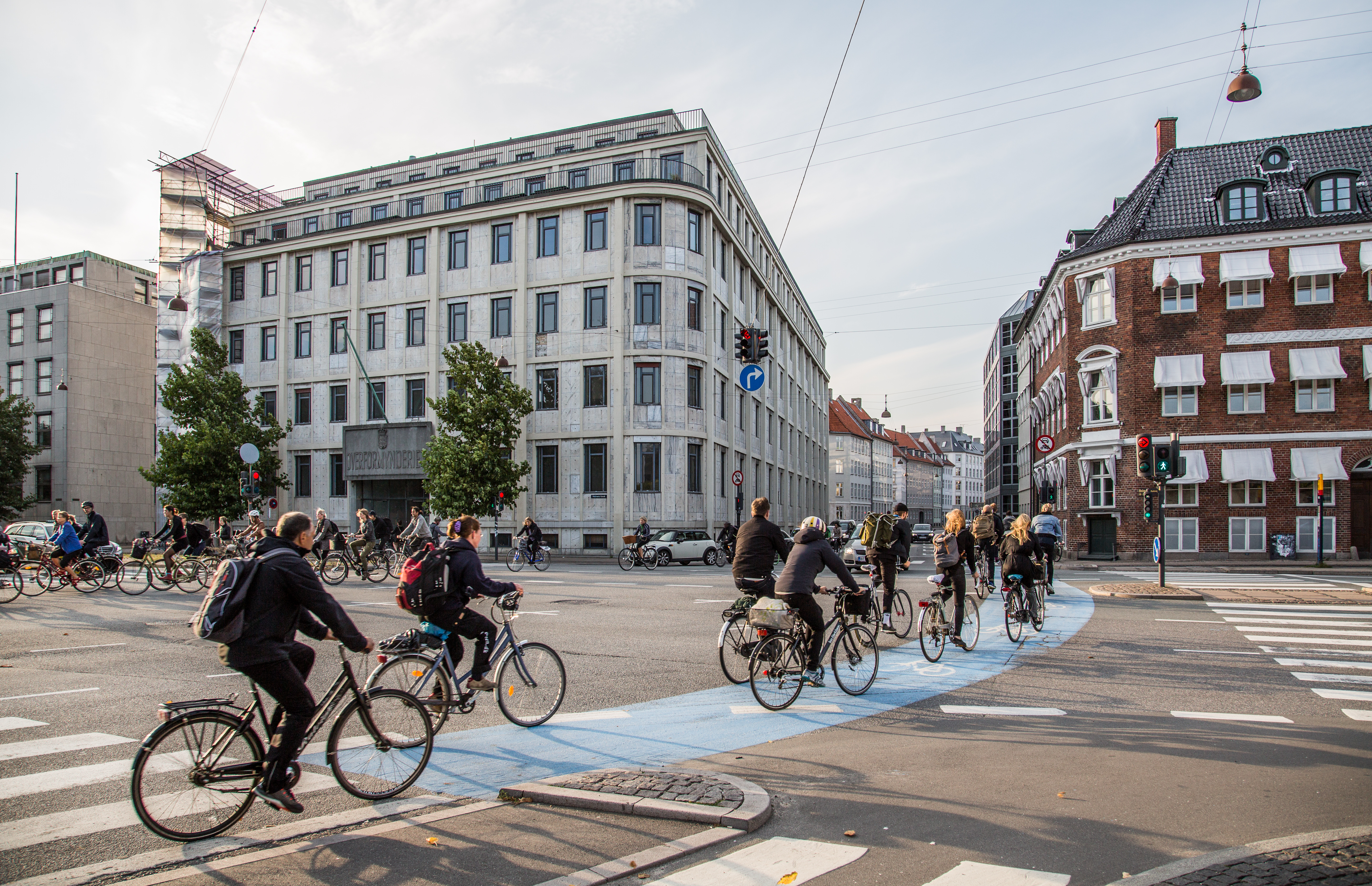
Cyclists commuting in Copenhagen

Active living is a health promotion philosophy and approach, defined as a way of life that integrates and values movement as a natural part of everyday living.Rather than focusing exclusively on structured exercise, active living emphasizes creating supportive social, physical, and policy environments that enable regular participation in movement throughout the lifespan. Although exercise is one component of active living, the concept encompasses a broader range of activities and recognizes that health-enhancing movement can occur through everyday routines such as walking, cycling, household tasks, occupational activities, recreation, and active transportation. Active living brings together urban planners, architects, transportation engineers, public health professionals, activists and other professionals to build places that encourage active living. One example includes efforts to build sidewalks, crosswalks, pedestrian crossing signals, and other ways for children to walk safely to and from school, as seen in the Safe Routes to School program. Recreational opportunities (parks, fitness centres etc.) close to the home or workplace, walking trails, and bike lanes for transportation also contribute to a more active lifestyle.

== History ==
The concept of active living emerged in Canada during the late 1980s and early 1990s as part of a broader shift in health promotion away from a narrow emphasis on structured exercise and physical fitness toward integrating movement into everyday life. The philosophy was strongly influenced by the principles of the Ottawa Charter for Health Promotion (1986), emphasizing supportive environments, community participation, empowerment, and intersectoral collaboration. Rather than focusing exclusively on organized sport or exercise, active living encouraged movement throughout daily life—including walking, cycling, recreation, work, household activities, and play—and sought to reduce environmental and social barriers to participation.

A qualitative study by Bercovitz (2000), based on interviews with key partners involved in the Canadian Active Living movement, found that although there was broad support for the concept, there was no single universally accepted definition. Participants described active living as encompassing health promotion, community development, public policy, environmental change, and lifestyle integration. Bercovitz (2000) concluded that the breadth of the concept was both one of its greatest strengths and one of its principal challenges, as differing interpretations complicated communication, implementation, and evaluation.

The Canadian concept of active living subsequently influenced physical activity promotion internationally, including community-based initiatives developed by the U.S. Centers for Disease Control and Prevention in the late 1990s. Following the release of the U.S. Surgeon General's Report on Physical Activity and Health in 1996, the Centers for Disease Control and Prevention (CDC) expanded efforts to promote active living through initiatives that emphasized community design and the built environment. In 1997, the CDC established the Active Community Environments (ACEs) initiative, coordinated by Rich Killingsworth and Tom Schmid, to encourage community planning and transportation policies that support routine physical activity. ACEs also helped catalyze programs such as KidsWalk-to-School and later informed the development of Active Living by Design, further strengthening the connections between health, the built environment, and community design.

During the late 1990s and 2000s, research increasingly focused on the measurable construct of physical activity, particularly within epidemiology and public health surveillance. Although the term active living became less prominent in scientific literature, many of its underlying principles—including ecological approaches to health, supportive environments, active transportation, and community design—continued to shape research, policy, and practice.

In 2000, Robert Wood Johnson Foundation formally launched their active living initiative. Led by Karen Gerlach, Marla Hollander, Kate Kraft and Tracy Orleans, this national effort comprised five national programs - Active Living by Design, Active Living Research, Active Living Leadership, Active Living Network and Active for Life. The goals of these programs included building the research base, establishing best practices and community models, supporting leadership efforts and connecting multi-sectoral professionals. The overarching goal was to develop an understanding of how the built environment impacted physical activity and what could be done to increase physical activity.

== Benefits ==
There are many health related benefits to being physically active and living an active life. Active living can help to reduce the risk of chronic diseases, improve overall health and well-being, reduce stress levels, minimize health related medical costs, help maintain a healthy weight, assist in proper balance and posture and the maintenance of healthy bones and strong muscles. Active living can also improve sleeping patterns and aid in the prevention of risk factors for heart disease such as blood cholesterol levels, diabetes and hypertension.

== Recommendations ==
In Canada, the Public Health Agency of Canada supported the Canadian Society for Exercise Physiology (CSEP) to review the Canada's Physical Activity Guides, which were updated and replaced with the Get Active Tip Sheets. The Get Active Tip Sheets are broken down into 4 age categories (5–11, 12–17, 18–64, and 65 & older).

The Get Active Tip Sheets recommend that children aged 5–11 and youth aged 12–17 should participate in at least 60 minutes of moderate to vigorous physical activity each day. The recommendation for adults 18–64 and for older adults 65 years and older is at least 2.5 hours of moderate to vigorous physical activity per week. These minutes do not all need to be done at the same time, but the recommendation is a minimum of 10 minutes at a time.

The World Health Organization states that “all physical activity counts.” This includes movement during work, transportation, and household tasks, as well as sports and exercise.

== Initiatives ==
In Canada, there are many active living initiatives currently in place. One of the most well-known programs is the ParticipACTION program, which aims to encourage Canadians to move more and increase their physical activity levels. Their mission statement is "ParticipACTION is the national voice of physical activity and sport participation in Canada. Through leadership in communications, capacity building and knowledge exchange, we inspire and support Canadians to move more." Since the 1970s, ParticipACTION has been motivating Canadians to live actively and participate in sports.

== See also ==
- Active mobility – Unmotorised transport powered by activity
- Automobile dependency – Concept that city layouts favor automobiles over other modes of transportation - automobile oriented transportation
- Automotive city – Urban planning prioritising automobiles
- Basal metabolic rate - the rate at which the body uses energy while at rest to maintain vital functions such as breathing and keeping warm
- Bicycle-friendly – Urban planning prioritising cycling
- Cycling mobility – Bicycling as transportation - transport on cycle
- Effects of the car on societies – Overview of the effects of cars on various societies
- Human-powered transport – Transport of goods and/or people only using human muscles
- Obesity and walking
- Pedestrian village – Urban planning for mixed-use areas prioritising pedestrians
- Sedentary lifestyle - a lifestyle with a lot of sitting and lying down, with very little to no exercise
- Social influences on fitness behavior – Effect on physical activity
- Urban vitality - the extent to which a place feels alive or lively
