= Recreation =

Activity of leisure

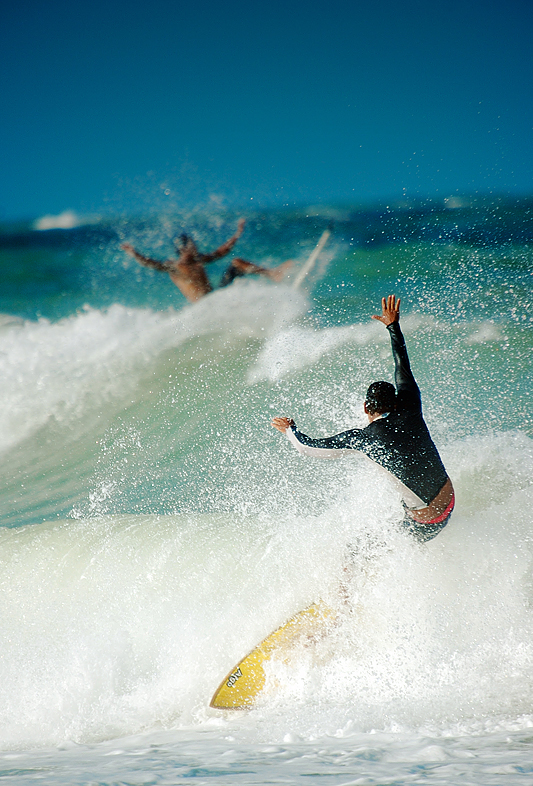
Surfing, a form of recreation

Recreation is an activity of leisure, often done for enjoyment, amusement, or pleasure and are considered to be "fun". The "need to do something for recreation" is an essential element of human biology and psychology.

== Etymology ==
The term recreation appears to have been used in English first in the late 14th century, first in the sense of "refreshment or curing of a sick person", and derived turn from Latin (re: "again", creare: "to create, bring forth, beget").

=== Prerequisites to leisure ===
People spend their time on activities of daily living, work, sleep, social duties and leisure, the latter time being free from prior commitments to physiologic or social needs, a prerequisite of recreation. Leisure has increased with increased longevity and, for many, with decreased hours spent for physical and economic survival, yet others argue that time pressure has increased for modern people, as they are committed to too many tasks. Other factors that account for an increased role of recreation are affluence, population trends, and increased commercialization of recreational offerings. While one perception is that leisure is just "spare time", time not consumed by the necessities of living, another holds that leisure is a force that allows individuals to consider and reflect on the values and realities that are missed in the activities of daily life, thus being an essential element of personal development and civilization. This direction of thought has even been extended to the view that leisure is the purpose of work, and a reward in itself, and "leisure life" reflects the values and character of a nation. Leisure is a human right under the Universal Declaration of Human Rights.

=== Play, recreation and work ===
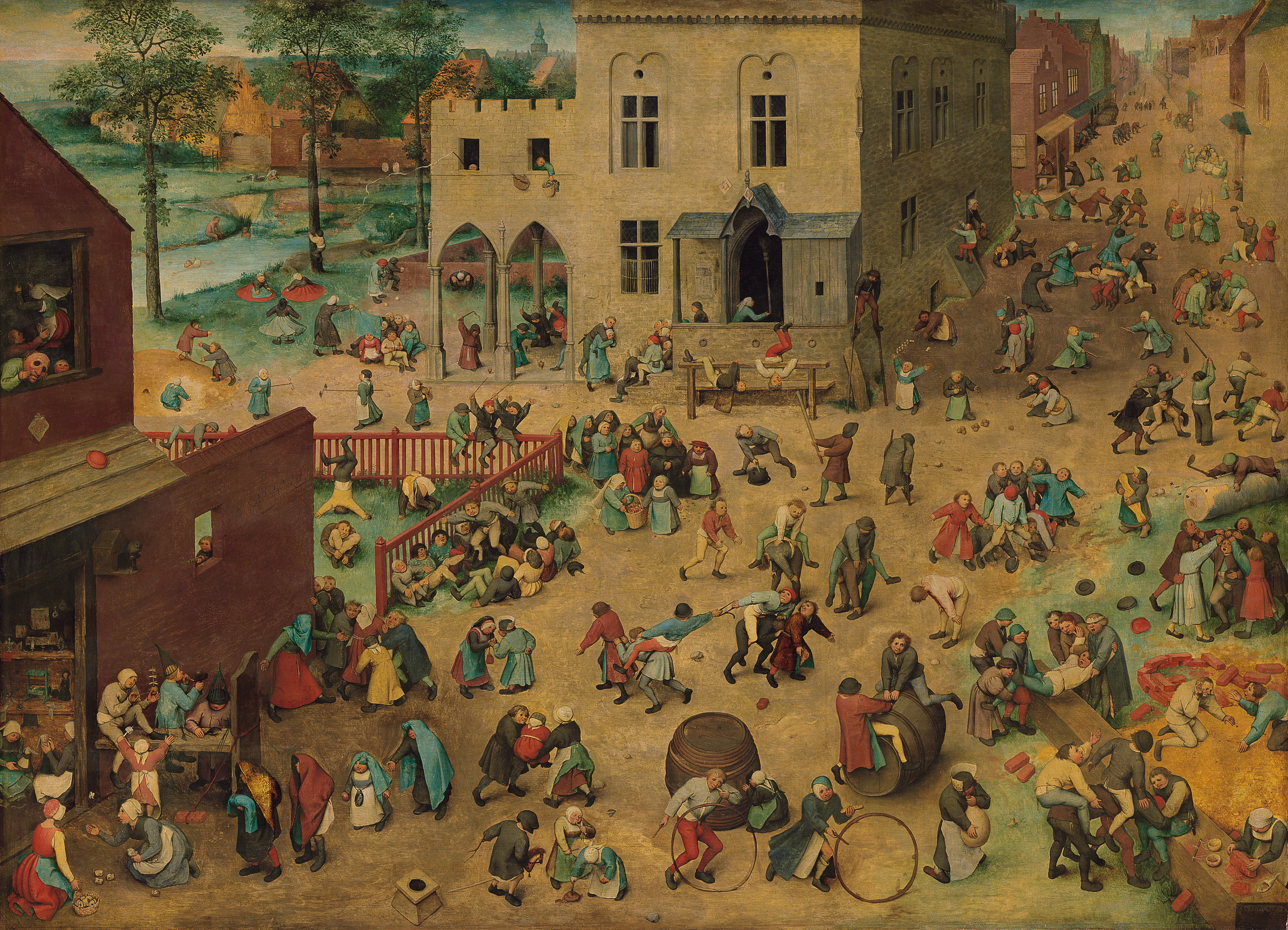
Pieter Bruegel Children's Games (1560)

Recreation is difficult to separate from the general concept of play, which is usually the term for children's recreational activity. Children may playfully imitate activities that reflect the realities of adult life. It has been proposed that play or recreational activities are outlets of or expression of excess energy, channeling it into socially acceptable activities that fulfill individual as well as societal needs, without need for compulsion, and providing satisfaction and pleasure for the participant. A traditional view holds that work is supported by recreation, recreation being useful to "recharge the battery" so that work performance is improved.

Work, an activity generally performed out of economic necessity and useful for society and organized within the economic framework, however can also be pleasurable and may be self-imposed thus blurring the distinction to recreation. Many activities in entertainment are work for one person and recreation for another. Over time, a recreational activity may become work, and vice versa. Thus, for a musician, playing an instrument may be at one time a profession, and at another a recreation.

Similarly, it may be difficult to separate education from recreation as in the case of recreational mathematics.

=== Health and recreation ===
Recreation has many health benefits, and, accordingly, Therapeutic Recreation has been developed to take advantage of this effect. The National Council for Therapeutic Recreation Certification (NCTRC) is the nationally recognized credentialing organization for the profession of Therapeutic Recreation. Professionals in the field of Therapeutic Recreation who are certified by the NCTRC are called "Certified Therapeutic Recreation Specialists". The job title "Recreation Therapist" is identified in the U.S. Dept of Labor's Occupation Outlook. Such therapy is applied in rehabilitation, psychiatric facilities for youth and adults, and in the care of the elderly, disabled people, or people with chronic diseases. Recreational physical activity is important to reduce obesity, and the risk of osteoporosis and of cancer, most significantly in men that of colon and prostate, and in women that of the breast; however, not all malignancies are reduced as outdoor recreation has been linked to a higher risk of melanoma. Extreme adventure recreation naturally carries its own hazards.

== Forms and activities ==
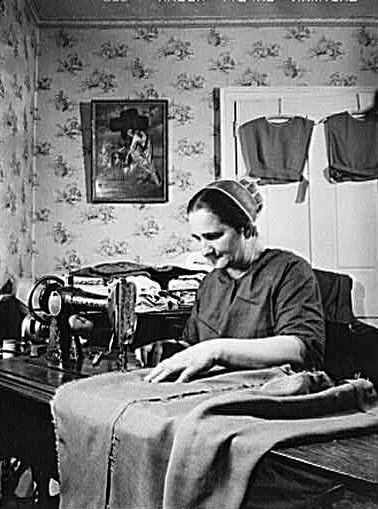
Mennonite woman dressmaking (1942)

Recreation is an essential part of human life and finds many different forms which are shaped naturally by individual interests but also by the surrounding social construction. Recreational activities can be communal or solitary, active or passive, outdoors or indoors, healthy or harmful, and useful for society or detrimental. Some recreational activities – such as gambling, recreational drug use, or delinquent activities – may violate societal norms and laws. A list of typical activities could be almost endless.

=== Hobby ===
A significant section of recreational activities are designated as hobbies which are activities done for pleasure on a regular basis. A hobby is considered to be a regular activity that is done for enjoyment, typically during one's leisure time, not professionally and not for pay. Hobbies include collecting themed items and objects, engaging in creative and artistic pursuits, playing sports, or pursuing other amusements. Participation in hobbies encourages acquiring substantial skills and knowledge in that area. A list of hobbies changes with renewed interests and developing fashions, making it diverse and lengthy. Hobbies tend to follow trends in society, for example stamp collecting was popular during the nineteenth and twentieth centuries as postal systems were the main means of communication, while video games are more popular nowadays following technological advances. The advancing production and technology of the nineteenth century provided workers with more availability in leisure time to engage in hobbies. Because of this, the efforts of people investing in hobbies have increased with time.

=== Bricolage ===
Bricolage and DIY are some of the terms describing the building, modifying, or repairing things without the direct aid of experts or professionals. Academic research has described DIY as behaviors where "individuals engage raw and semi-raw materials and parts to produce, transform, or reconstruct material possessions, including those drawn from the natural environment (e.g., landscaping)". DIY behavior can be triggered by various motivations previously categorized as marketplace motivations (economic benefits, lack of product availability, lack of product quality, need for customization), and identity enhancement (craftsmanship, empowerment, community seeking, uniqueness). They could involve crafts that require particular skills and knowledge of skilled work. Typical interests enjoyed by the maker culture include engineering-oriented pursuits such as home improvement, electronics, robotics, 3D printing, and the use of Computer Numeric Control tools, as well as more traditional activities such as metalworking, woodworking, and, mainly, its predecessor, traditional arts and crafts. The subculture stresses a cut-and-paste approach to standardized hobbyist technologies, and encourages cookbook re-use of designs published on websites and maker-oriented publications. There is a strong focus on using and learning practical skills and applying them to reference designs. There is also growing work on equity and the maker culture.

=== Games ===
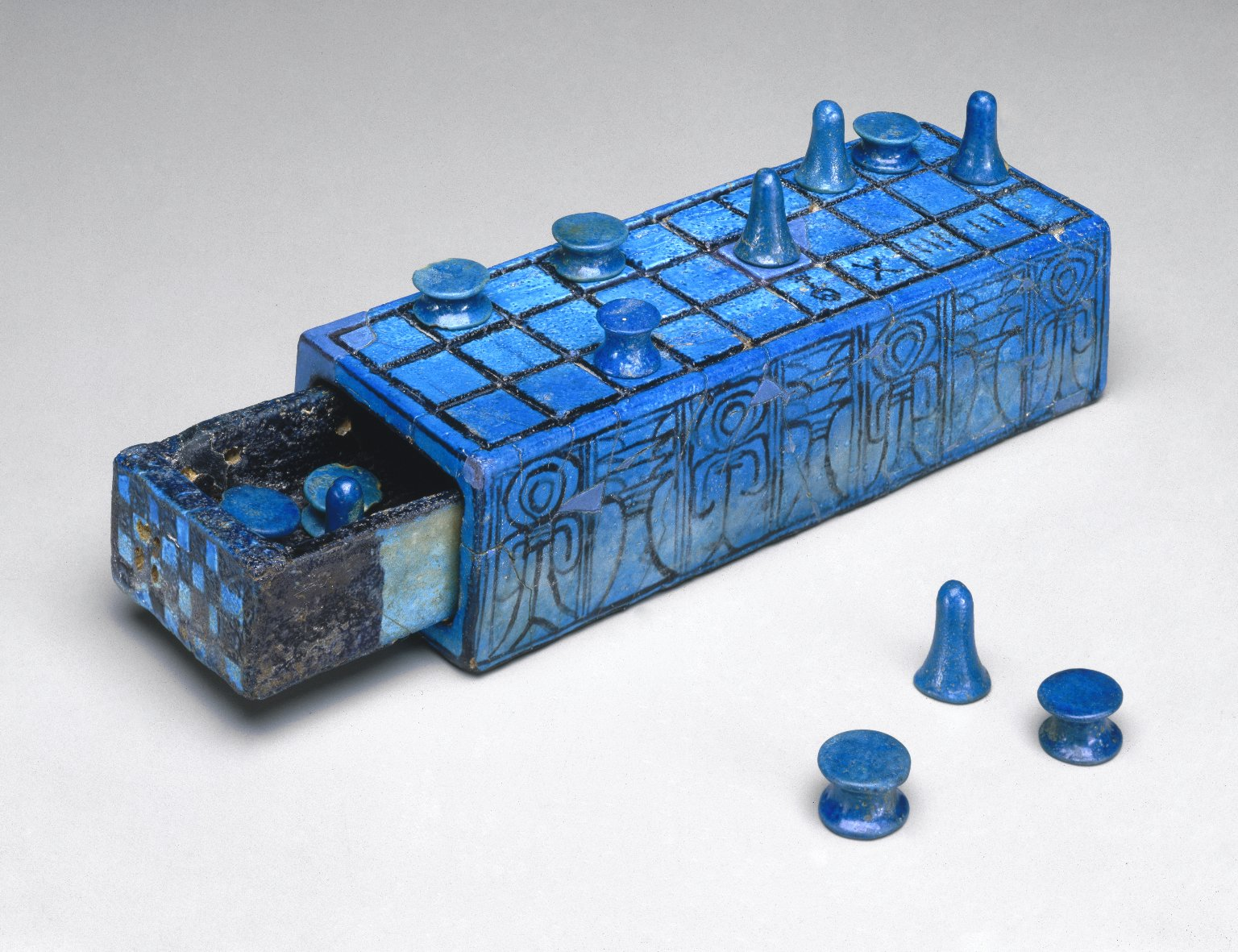
Ancient Egyptian gaming board inscribed for Amenhotep III with separate sliding drawer, from 1390 to 1353 BC, made of glazed faience, dimensions: 5.5 × 7.7 × 21 cm, in the Brooklyn Museum (New York City)

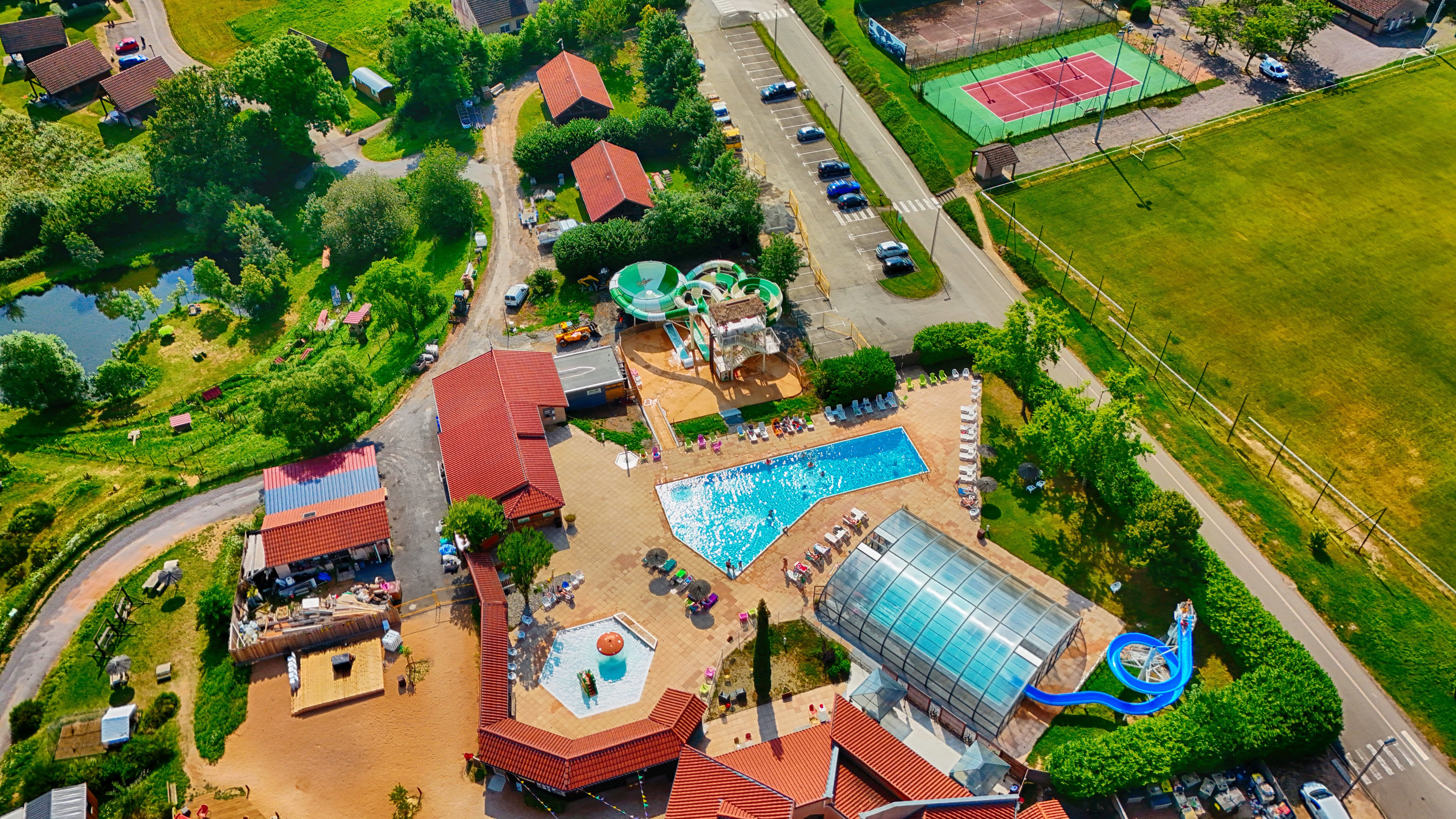
Aerial view of a recreational swimming pool complex

Any structured form of play could become a game. Games are played sometimes purely for recreation, sometimes for achievement or monetary rewards as well. They are played for recreation alone, in teams, or online; by amateurs. Professionals can play as part of their work for entertainment of the audience. The games could be board games, puzzles, computer or video games, or sports.

=== Outdoor recreation ===
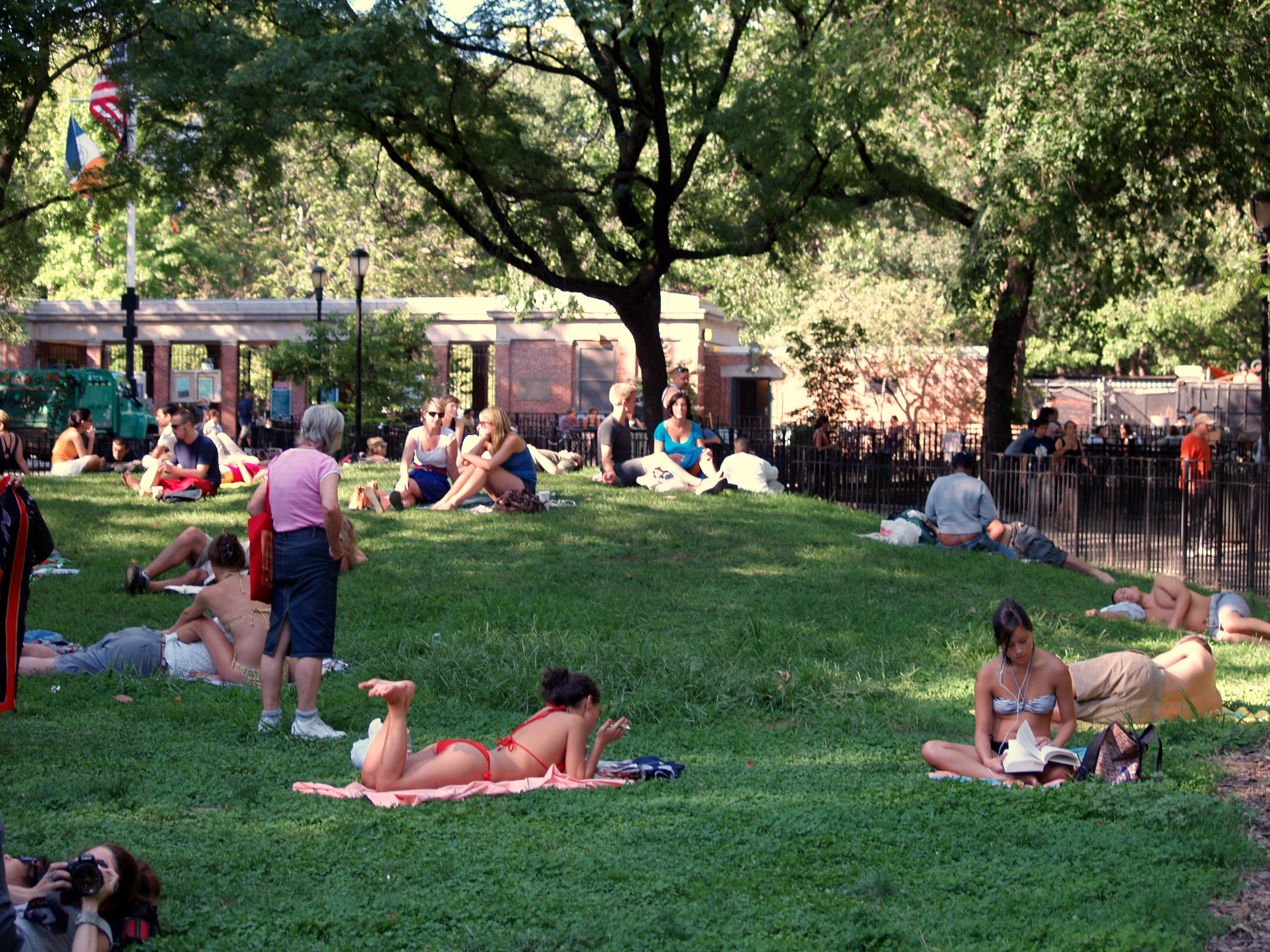
A park in New York City where people sunbathe and relax

Recreation engaged in out of doors, most commonly in natural settings. The activities themselves — such as fishing, hunting, backpacking, and horseback riding — characteristically dependent on the environment practiced in. While many of these activities can be classified as sports, they do not all demand that a participant be an athlete. Competition generally is less stressed than in individual or team sports organized into opposing squads in pursuit of a trophy or championship. When the activity involves exceptional excitement, physical challenge, or risk, it is sometimes referred to as "adventure recreation" or "adventure training", rather than an extreme sport.

Other traditional examples of outdoor recreational activities include hiking, camping, mountaineering, cycling, canoeing, caving, kayaking, rafting, rock climbing, running, sailing, skateboarding, skiing, sky diving and surfing. As new pursuits, often hybrids of prior ones, emerge, they gain their own identities, such as coasteering, canyoning, fastpacking, and plogging.

=== Performing arts ===
==== Dance ====
Contra dancers creating their own recreation at a ball in New Hampshire, United States (silent video)

Participatory dance, whether it be a folk dance, a social dance, a group dance such as a line, circle, chain or square dance, or a partner dance, as is common in Western ballroom dancing, is undertaken primarily for a common purpose, such as entertainment, social interaction or exercise, by participants rather than onlookers. The many forms of dance provide recreation for all age groups and cultures.

==== Music creation ====
Music is composed and performed for many purposes, ranging from recreation, religious or ceremonial purposes, or for entertainment. When music was only available through sheet music scores, such as during the Classical and Romantic eras in Europe, music lovers would buy the sheet music of their favourite pieces and songs so that they could perform them at home on their instruments.

==== Playing video games ====
Video games are immersive experiences that leave some of the aesthetics to be defined by the player while reserving the author's authority on the latter.

=== Visual arts ===
Woodworking, photography, moviemaking, jewelry making, software projects such as Photoshopping and home music or video production, making bracelets, artistic projects such as drawing, painting, Cosplay (design, creation, and wearing of a costume based on an already existing creative property), creating models out of card stock or paper (called papercraft) fall under the category visual arts. Many of these are practised for recreation.

==== Drawing ====
Drawing goes back at least 16,000 years to Paleolithic cave representations of animals such as those at Lascaux in France and Altamira in Spain. In ancient Egypt, ink drawings on papyrus, often depicting people, were used as models for painting or sculpture. Drawings on Greek vases, initially geometric, later developed to the human form with black-figure pottery during the 7th century BC.

With paper becoming common in Europe by the 15th century, drawing was adopted by masters such as Sandro Botticelli, Raphael, Michelangelo, and Leonardo da Vinci who sometimes treated drawing as an art in its own right rather than a preparatory stage for painting or sculpture.

==== Painting ====
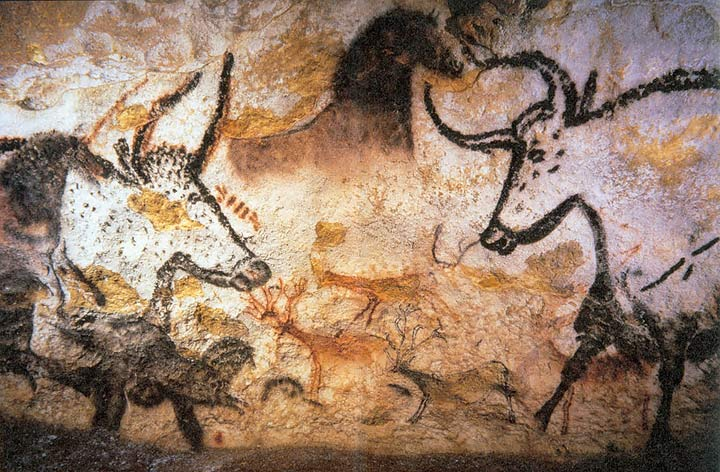
Depiction of aurochs, horses and deer in Lascaux

Like drawing, painting has its documented origins in caves and on rock faces. The finest examples, believed by some to be 32,000 years old, are in the Chauvet and Lascaux caves in southern France. In shades of red, brown, yellow and black, the paintings on the walls and ceilings are of bison, cattle, horses and deer. Paintings of human figures can be found in the tombs of ancient Egypt. In the great temple of Ramses II, Nefertari, his queen, is depicted being led by Isis. Greek and Roman art like the Hellenistic Fayum mummy portraits and Battle of Issus at Pompeii contributed to Byzantine art in the 4th century BC, which initiated a tradition in icon painting. Models of aeroplanes, boats, cars, tanks, artillery, and even figures of soldiers and superheroes are popular subjects to build, paint and display.

==== Photography ====
An amateur photographer practices photography as a hobby/passion and not for monetary profit. The quality of some amateur work may be highly specialized or eclectic in choice of subjects. Amateur photography is often pre-eminent in photographic subjects which have little prospect of commercial use or reward. Amateur photography grew during the late 19th century due to the popularization of the Hand-held camera. Nowadays it has spread widely through social media and is carried out throughout different platforms and equipment, including the use of cell phone. Clear pictures can now be taken with a cell phone which is a key tool for making photography more accessible to everyone.

==== Literature ====
Writing may involve letters, journals and web blogs. In the US, about half of all adults read one or more books for pleasure each year. About 5% read more than 50 books per year.

== Organized recreation ==
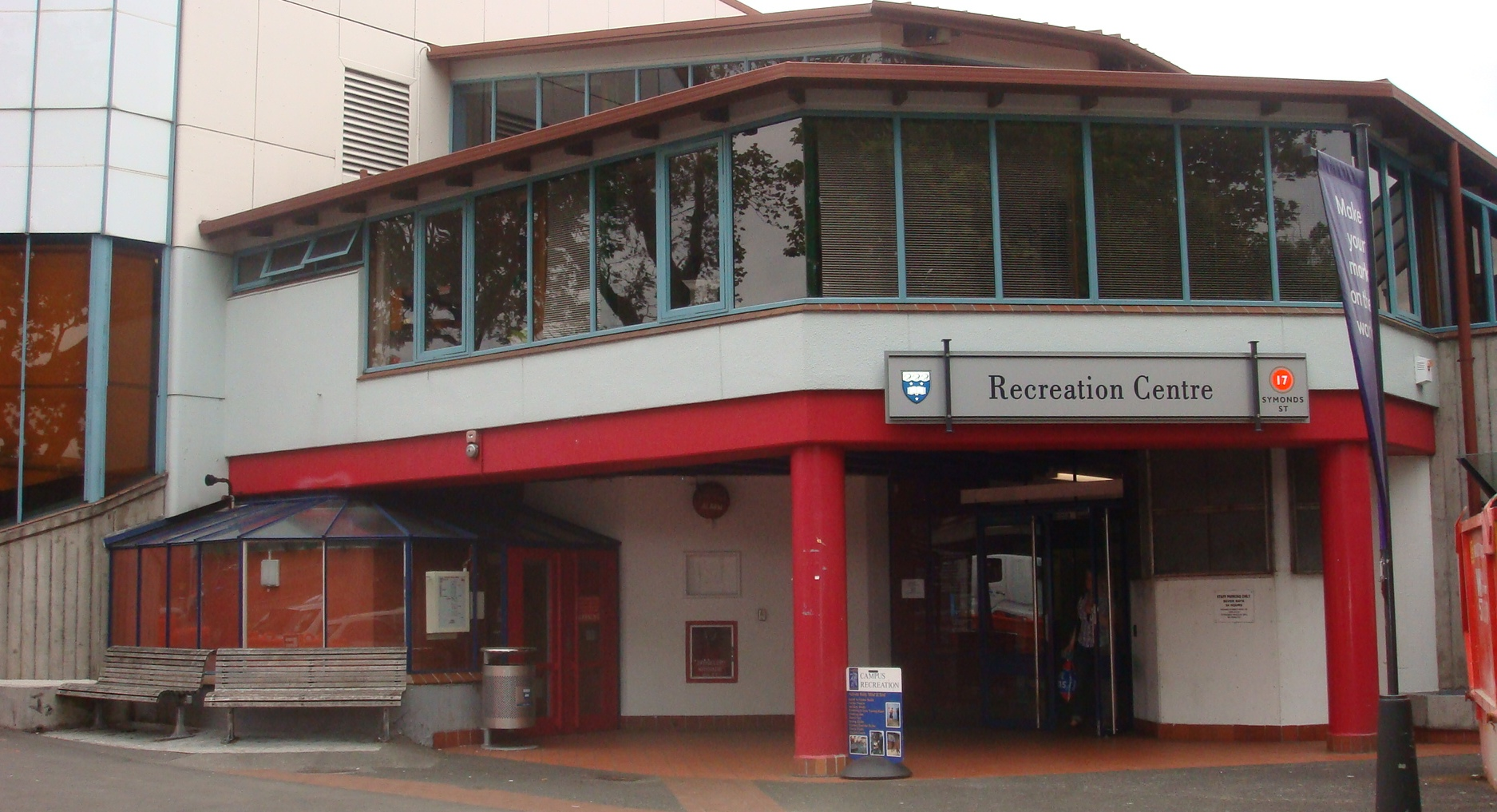
University of Auckland Recreation Centre

Many recreational activities are organized, typically by public institutions, voluntary group-work agencies, private groups supported by membership fees, and commercial enterprises. Examples of each of these are the National Park Service, the YMCA, the Kiwanis, and Walt Disney World. Public space such as parks and beaches are essential venues for many recreational activities and Tourism has recognized that many visitors are specifically attracted by recreational offerings. In particular, beach and waterfront promenades such as the beach area of Venice Beach in California, the Promenade de la Croisette in Cannes, the Promenade des Anglais in Nice or the lungomare of Barcola with Miramare Castle in Trieste are important recreational areas for the city population on the one hand and on the other also important tourist destinations with all advantages and disadvantages for the locals.

In support of recreational activities government has taken an important role in their creation, maintenance, and organization, and whole industries have developed merchandise or services. Recreation-related business is an important factor in the economy; it has been estimated that the outdoor recreation sector alone contributes $730 billion annually to the U.S. economy and generates 6.5 million jobs.

=== Recreation center ===
A recreation center is a place for recreational activities usually administered by a municipal government agency. Swimming, basketball, weightlifting, volleyball and kids' play areas are very common.

=== Recreation as a career ===
A recreation specialist would be expected to meet the recreational needs of a community or assigned interest group. Educational institutions offer courses that lead to a degree as a Bachelor of Arts in recreation management. People with such degrees often work in parks and recreation centers in towns, on community projects and activities. Networking with instructors, budgeting, and evaluation of continuing programs are common job duties.

In the United States, most states have a professional organization for continuing education and certification in recreation management. The National Recreation and Park Association administers a certification program called the CPRP (Certified Park and Recreation Professional) that is considered a national standard for professional recreation specialist practices.

=== e-commerce ===
Since the beginning of the 2000s, there are more and more online booking / ticketing platforms for recreational activities that emerged. Many of them leveraged the ever-growing prevalence of internet, mobile devices and e-payments to build comprehensive online booking solutions. The first successful batch includes tourist recreation activities platform like TripAdvisor that went public. The emergence of these platforms infers the rising needs for recreation and entertainment from the growing urban citizens worldwide.

== See also ==
- Adventure recreation
- Amusement
- Art
- Entertainment
- Fun
- Hobby
- Lack of physical education
- National Recreation Area
- Play
- R&R (military)
- Recreation area
- Recreation room
- Social determinants of health
- Social determinants of mental health
- Social determinants of health in poverty
- Tourist attraction
- Work-life balance
