= Philippe de Gaspé Beaubien =

Canadian proprietor and civil servant (1928–2025)

Philippe de Gaspé Beaubien OC
- Born: January 12, 1928; Outremont, Quebec, Canada
- Died: April 9, 2025 (aged 97); Laurentian Mountains, Quebec, Canada
- Occupation: Media proprietor
- Family: Don Mattrick (son-in-law)

Philippe de Gaspé Beaubien OC (January 12, 1928 – April 9, 2025) was a Canadian media proprietor, who was chairman and CEO of Telemedia. He founded the company in 1968, and went on to acquire a number of radio stations in Quebec and Ontario, and launched magazines such as Canadian Living, Harrowsmith and the Canadian editions of ELLE and TV Guide.

== Life and career ==
De Gaspé Beaubien was born on January 12, 1928, in Outremont, Quebec. In 1990, together with his wife (the former Nan Bowles O'Connell, an American whom he married in 1956; they have three children), he launched The Business Families Foundation (BFF), a non-profit charitable organization established in Canada to help business families in Canada and abroad.

He was educated at the Université de Montréal, obtaining a Bachelor of Arts in 1952, and at Harvard University, receiving his MBA in 1954. He was also a key organizer behind Expo 67. De Gaspé Beaubien was chairman of the Canadian Association of Broadcasters in 1973 and 1974, and was the founder, president and honorary chairman of participACTION.

De Gaspé Beaubien died on April 9, 2025, at the age of 97.

== Awards ==
De Gaspé Beaubien was also presented with an honorary degree in law from York University in 1979, and was inducted into the Canadian Association of Broadcasters Hall of Fame in 1994.

In 1967, he was made an Officer of the Order of Canada "for his contribution to Centennial Year as director of operations for the 1967 World Exhibition".

In 1990, de Gaspé Beaubien and his wife created the Gaspé Beaubien Foundation to focus their philanthropic activities. The main themes of the Foundation's activities have been related to family business initiatives and clean water technologies.

In 2008, de Gaspé Beaubien and his wife, Nan-B, received an honorary degree from the University of British Columbia.
