= Complete communities =

Planning meeting needs of all residents

Complete communities is an urban and rural planning concept that aims to meet the basic needs of all residents in a community, regardless of income, culture, or political ideologies through integrated land use planning, transportation planning, and community design. While the concept is used by many communities as part of their community plan, each plan interprets what complete community means in their own way. The idea of the complete community has roots in early planning theory, beginning with The Garden City Movement, and is a component of contemporary planning methods including Smart Growth.

== History ==
The Garden City Movement was one of the first proponents for creating communities that accommodate a wide range of community members through a mix in housing types and uses. Increasing urban sprawl, and its associated negative social, environmental, and health effects, prompted a turn in theory towards increasing density in urban areas. This idea has been brought into contemporary theoretical movements including Smart Growth, New Urbanism, and Sustainable Development, which all advocate high-density 'compact' communities, and also increase the mix of activities and land uses that contribute to a complete community. The move toward compact and complete communities in modern planning is summarized in the first two Ahwahnee Principles, a landmark document created by the California Local Government Commission that provided the foundation for Smart Growth and New Urbanism: (1) "all planning should be in the form of complete and integrated communities including housing, shops, workplaces, schools, parks and civic facilities essential to the daily life of the residents" and (2) "community size should be designed so that housing, jobs, daily needs, and other activities are within easy walking distance of each other."

Since the 1970s, Canadian planning policy has aimed to make communities more attractive and efficient through compact form, mixed-use, higher densities and a range of housing types. Households in North America are becoming smaller, have a different form than previous generations and are more socially and economically diverse; while housing costs have increased dramatically in some parts of the country, resulting in smaller lot sizes and an increase in multi-family housing options and suburban density.

One of the typical critiques of past suburban growth patterns is that they replicate trends of a homogeneous landscape consisting mainly of white, middle class, nuclear families. Social diversity and affordability looked to be addressed through the creation of a different form, through the design of new communities that look to promote diversity. When measured on a scale looking at four elements of complete communities - living, working, moving, thriving - New York City and San Francisco rank at the top, while Atlanta and Dallas ranked quite low.

== Defining elements ==
The 'complete community' is seen as a way to deal with issues of social isolation, address inefficient land uses and meet the needs of diverse households.

A common definition of a complete community is one where people live, work and play, and where the automobile is left at home in favour of walking and public transport. This is supported by a diverse housing mix. While each community applies the term in its own way as part of its community plans, there are several defining elements.

=== Densification ===
A benchmark for complete communities is access to services within a five-minute walk, which contrasts the typical sprawl associated with the suburbs.

=== Diverse housing mix ===
In Canada, many municipalities have focused on providing a mix of housing types as the key component of creating a complete community based on directives from provincial and regional policies.

=== Diverse land use mix ===
Complete communities advocate for densification within existing neighbourhoods to provide services to users which sometimes run in contrast to zoning regulations currently there. Barriers to complete communities include zoning and bylaws that do not promote building with diverse uses and design in mind.

=== Employment options ===
One central goal of developing complete communities involves promoting a concentration of employment opportunities, with a labour force both working and living within the geographic boundaries of the community. This is believed to be a response to the negative effects associated with commuter towns.

=== Transportation options ===
As the suburbs grew, roadways that prioritised the automobile grew with them. Especially in the United States, widened and expanded metropolitan areas led to poor inner-suburb communities, which worked to destroy the connection to neighbourhoods, institutions, parks and town centres. Planners began to advocate for a community plan where a mix of housing types and uses in compact form would be centred around transportation nodes for ease of mobility of residents. Additionally, some transportation planners take planning for a connected community one step further by pushing for inclusive multi-modal and equitable transportation systems that work for people of all ages, ability, income and racial demography.

== Debate/Critique ==
Although there is a general definition for complete communities, the term sometimes has differing meanings within certain contexts. Within many municipal plans the term complete community is used to describe a city mandate, without a given description of how the community defines the term. This leads to the term being used for a number of different objectives, depending on the goals of the specific community.

While many planners look to use urban policy as a way of creating a diverse housing mix, some critics argue that it is actually market pressures rather than planners and policy makers who are actually creating the increase in the share of multi-family housing in suburban areas. Most developers will not actually use the term ‘complete communities,’ however, many larger master-planning developers will talk about providing a range of housing types as a way of remaining competitive and selling community.

== Examples ==
The following are examples of places that have been described as complete communities:

- Kirkland, Washington

The following are examples of places that have gone through, or are currently undergoing, a planning process that is informed by the concept of a complete community:

- Bend, Oregon
- Metro Vancouver, British Columbia
- City of North Vancouver, British Columbia
- Winnipeg, Manitoba
- Greater Golden Horseshoe, Ontario
- Austin, Texas
- Vancouver Campus of the University of British Columbia, British Columbia
- City of Nanaimo, British Columbia
- Town of Gibsons, British Columbia
- City of St. Albert, Alberta

== See also ==
- 15-minute city
- Compact city
- Complete streets
- Garden City Movement
- Healthy city
- Healthy community design
- Most livable cities
- New Urbanism
- Social determinants of obesity
- Smart Growth
- Street reclamation
