= Kelly Murumets =

Canadian business executive (born 1963)

Kelly D. Murumets

President and CEO of Tennis Canada
- In office March 3, 2014 – July 2017
- Preceded by: Michael S. Downey
- Succeeded by: Michael S. Downey

President and CEO of ParticipACTION
- In office 2007 – March 3, 2014
- Preceded by: Russ Kisby
- Succeeded by: Elio Antunes

Personal details
- Born: 1963 (age 62–63) Kitchener, Ontario, Canada
- Spouse: Roy Graydon
- Children: 2
- Education: Bishop's University (B.A.); Wilfrid Laurier University (MSW); Richard Ivey School of Business (M.B.A.)

Kelly D. Murumets (born 1963) is a Canadian business executive who served as the president and chief executive officer (CEO) of Tennis Canada from 2014 to 2017. She was also the president and CEO of ParticipACTION, a non-profit organization which promotes healthy living and physical fitness, from 2007 to 2014.

== Early life ==
Murumets was born in Kitchener, Ontario. She attended ten different schools as a child, and graduated from Welland Centennial Secondary School in Welland, Ontario, playing volleyball, basketball, tennis, and track and field. She earned a Bachelor of Arts from Bishop's University in 1985, a Master of Business Administration (MBA) from the Richard Ivey School of Business, and a Master of Social Work from Wilfrid Laurier University in 1996.

== Career ==
Her first job after earning her undergraduate degree was at W.C. Wood Co., an appliance manufacturer. Prior to 2002, Murumets was the vice president and client manager for Managerial Design Corporation, a management consulting firm. She was named the executive vice president of Counsel Corporation in February 2002 and the executive vice president of Acceris Communications in December 2002. She was promoted to president of Acceris in November 2003.

In 2007, Murumets was named the president and CEO of ParticipACTION, a Canadian non-profit organization which promotes healthy living and physical fitness. ParticipACTION had been shut down in 2001 when it lost its government funding, but was revived under Murumets. She was named one of the most influential women in sport and physical activity by the Canadian Association for the Advancement of Women and Sport and Physical Activity (CAAWS). She received a Queen Elizabeth II Diamond Jubilee Medal on January 12, 2013, awarded to Canadians for "outstanding service to their country". She was succeeded by Elio Antunes as the president and CEO.

On March 3, 2014, she became the president and CEO of Tennis Canada. She replaced Michael Downey, who left Tennis Canada to head the British Lawn Tennis Association.

She has served on the board of governors for both Bishop's University and Wilfrid Laurier University. She is a member of the Young Presidents' Organization.

== Personal life ==
Murumets lives in Toronto with her partner Roy Graydon. She enjoys skiing, golfing, scuba-diving, and hiking, having climbed both Mount Kilimanjaro and Mount Rainier.
