= Public interest design =

Design practice

Public interest design is a human-centered and participatory design practice that places emphasis on the “triple bottom line” of sustainable design that includes ecological, economic, and social issues and on designing products, structures, and systems that address issues such as economic development and the preservation of the environment. Projects incorporating public interest design focus on the general good of the local citizens with a fundamentally collaborative perspective.

Starting in the late 1990s, several books, convenings, and exhibitions have generated new momentum and investment in public interest design. Since then, public interest design—frequently described as a movement or field—has gained public recognition.

== History ==
Public interest design grew out of the community design movement, which got its start in 1968 after American civil rights leader Whitney Young issued a challenge to attendees of the American Institute of Architects (AIA) national convention:

". . . you are not a profession that has distinguished itself by your social and civic contributions to the cause of civil rights, and I am sure this does not come to you as any shock. You are most distinguished by your thunderous silence and your complete irrelevance."

The response to Young’s challenge was the establishment of community design centers (CDCs) across the United States. CDCs, which were often established with the support of area universities, provided a variety of design services – such as affordable housing - within their own neighborhoods.

In architecture schools, “design/build programs” provided outreach to meet local design needs, particularly in low-income and underserved areas. One of the earliest design/build programs was Yale University’s Vlock Building Project. The project, which was initiated by students at Yale University School of Architecture in 1967, requires graduate students to design and build low-income housing.

One of the most publicized programs is the Auburn University Rural Studio design/build program, which was founded in 1993. Samuel Mockbee and D.K. Ruth created the program to inspire hands-on community-outreach and service-based architectural opportunities for students. The program gained traction due to Mockbee investing in the low-income housing aesthetics — an aspect previously downplayed in architectural design of houses for the poor. Mockbee and Ruth expressed their understanding of the communities through their architectural designs; the visuals and functionality address the needs of the citizens. The Rural Studio’s first project, Bryant House, was completed in 1994 for $16,500.

== Public Interest Design from the 1990s – Present ==
Interest in public interest design – particularly socially responsible architecture – began to grow during the 1990s and continued into the first decade of the new millennium in reaction to the expansive globalization. Conferences, books, and exhibitions began to showcase the design work being done beyond the community design centers, which had greatly decreased in numbers since their peak in the seventies.

Non-profit organizations – including Architecture for Humanity, BaSiC Initiative, Design Corps, Public Architecture, Project H, Project Locus, and MASS Design Group – began to provide design services that served a larger segment of the population than had been served by traditional design professions.

Many public interest design organizations also provide training and service-learning programs for architecture students and graduates. In 1999, the Enterprise Rose Architectural Fellowship was established, giving young architects the opportunity to work on three-year-long design and community development projects in low-income communities.

Two of the earliest formal public interest design programs include the Gulf Coast Community Design Studio at Mississippi State University and the Public Interest Design Summer Program at the University of Texas . In February 2015, Portland State University launched the first graduate certificate program in Public Interest Design in the United States.

The first professional-level training was conducted in July 2011 by the Public Interest Design Institute (PIDI) and held at the Harvard Graduate School of Design.

Also in 2011, a survey of American Institute of Architects (AIA), 77% of AIA members agreed that the mission of the professional practice of public interest design could be defined as the belief that every person should be able to live in a socially, economically, and environmentally healthy community.

== Conferences and exhibits ==
The annual Structures for Inclusion conference showcases public interest design projects from around the world. The first conference, which was held in 2000, was called “Design for the 98% Without Architects." Speaking at the conference, Rural Studio co-founder Samuel Mockbee challenged attendees to serve a greater segment of the population: “I believe most of us would agree that American architecture today exists primarily within a thin band of elite social and economic conditions...in creating architecture, and ultimately community, it should make no difference which economic or social type is served, as long as the status quo of the actual world is transformed by an imagination that creates a proper harmony for both the affluent and the disadvantaged."

In 2007, the Cooper Hewitt National Design Museum held an exhibition, titled “Design for the Other 90%,” curated by Cynthia Smith. Following the success of this exhibit, Smith developed the "Design Other 90" initiative into an ongoing series, the second of which was titled “Design for the Other 90%: CITIES” (2011), held at the United Nations headquarters. In 2010, Andres Lipek of the Museum of Modern Art in New York curated an exhibit, called “Small Scale, Big Change: New Architectures of Social Engagement.”

== Professional Networks ==
One of the oldest professional networks related to public interest design is the professional organization Association for Community Design (ACD), which was founded in 1977.

In 2005, adopting a term coined by architect Kimberly Dowdell, the Social Economic Environmental Design (SEED) Network was co-founded by a group of community design leaders, during a meeting hosted by the Loeb Fellowship at the Harvard Graduate School of Design. The SEED Network established a common set of five principles and criteria for practitioners of public interest design. An evaluation tool called the SEED Evaluator is available to assist designers and practitioners in developing projects that align with SEED Network goals and criteria.

In 2006, the Open Architecture Network was launched by Architecture for Humanity in conjunction with co-founder Cameron Sinclair's TED Wish. Taking on the name Worldchanging in 2011, the network is an open-source community dedicated to improving living conditions through innovative and sustainable design. Designers of all persuasions can share ideas, designs and plans as well as collaborate and manage projects. while protecting their intellectual property rights using the Creative Commons "some rights reserved" licensing system.

In 2007, DESIGN 21: Social Design Network, an online platform built in partnership with UNESCO, was launched.

In 2011, the Design Other 90 Network was launched by the Cooper-Hewitt, National Design Museum, in conjunction with its Design with the Other 90%: CITIES exhibition.

In 2012, IDEO.org, with the support of The Bill & Melinda Gates Foundation, launched HCD Connect, a network for social sector leaders committed to human-centered design. In this context, human-centered design begins with the end-user of a product, place, or system — taking into account their needs, behaviors and desires. The fast-growing professional network of 15,000 builds on "The Human-Centered Design Toolkit," which was designed specifically for people, nonprofits, and social enterprises that work with low-income communities throughout the world. People using the HCD Toolkit or human-centered design in the social sector now have a place to share their experiences, ask questions, and connect with others working in similar areas or on similar challenges.

== See also ==
- Design/Build
- Healthy community design
- Leadership in Energy and Environmental Design
- Opinion poll
- Participatory design
- Public opinion
- Sustainable architecture
- Sustainable Design
- Social design
- Voting
