= Social influences on fitness behavior =

Effect on physical activity

Social influences on fitness behavior are the effect that social influences have on whether people start and maintain physical activities. Physical fitness is maintained by a range of physical activities. Physical activity is defined by the World Health Organization as "any bodily movement produced by skeletal muscles that requires energy expenditure." Human factors and social influences are important in starting and maintaining such activities. Social environments can influence motivation and persistence, through pressures towards social conformity.

== Obesity ==
Obesity is a physical marker of poor health, increasing the likelihood of various diseases. Due to social constructs surrounding health, the belief that being skinny is healthy and discrimination against those perceived to be 'unhealthy', people who are considered overweight or obese on the BMI scale face many social challenges. Challenges can range from basic things such as buying clothes, pressure from society to change their body, and being unable to get a job. This can lead to various problems such as eating disorders, self-esteem issues, and misdiagnosis and improper treatment of physical ailments due to discrimination. People who are obese are also less likely to seek medical care than people who are not obese, even if their weight is caused by medical problems.

=== Children ===
Unusual weight or lack of psychical activity has been proven to be a cause of low self esteem, this usually leads to long term negativity. In older children This tends to lead to things like eating disorders and depression. Unusual weight in children does not prove a lack of activity or exercise.

== Fitness media influences ==
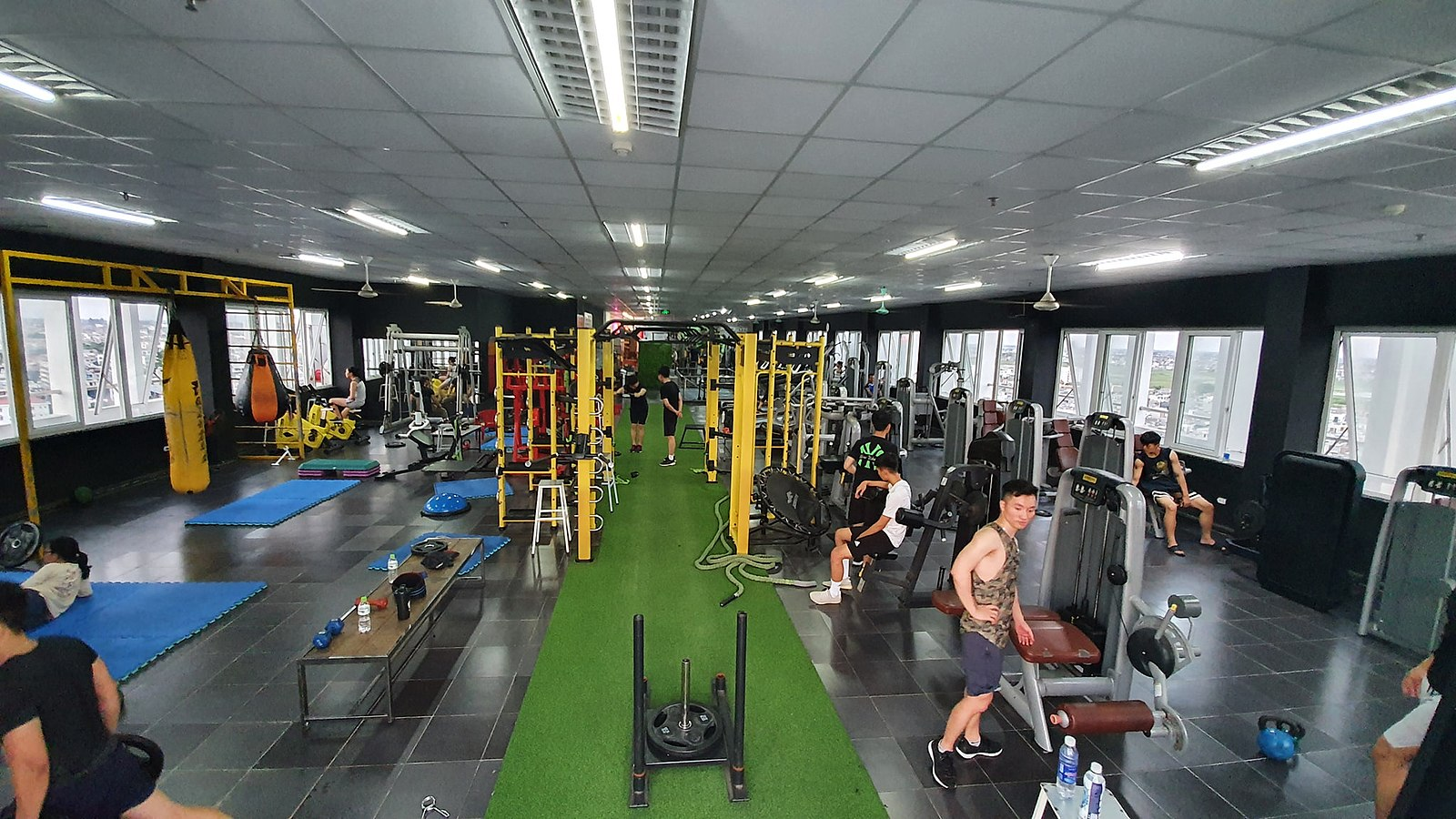

Positive effects of Instagram

Instagram can be a community of people who post their fitness goals to motivate themselves and others. Individuals and personal trainers post weight loss transformations, at home workouts, sports, and lifestyle changes. People post and share their appreciation for the sport and introduce it to people. People in these communities can also share their progress in and gain positive feedback from their peers.

A 2022 study examined how fitness influencers on YouTube affect people's intentions to exercise. Across two studies involving 507 and 445 participants, researchers found that an influencer's perceived ability to motivate viewers was an important predictor of their intention to engage in physical activity. The findings suggest that online fitness personalities may encourage exercise when viewers find their content motivating.

Negative effects of Instagram

Instagram can also cause harm because people compare themselves to fitness professionals and models who have a very fit physique, some of whom—‌unknown to the viewer—‌may have a substantially easier time attaining such physiques due to any one or more of a number of factors, such as genetic predisposition. Seeing lots of people who appear to be healthy and fit can have people comparing themselves and not liking what they see in the mirror. Seeing people who have a nice physique can make people develop eating disorders and body dysmorphia. This can lead to use of steroids and performance-enhancing drugs to help improve the look of peoples physique. A side effect of doing this is people prioritize how they look and not their health which makes it unhealthy to do. people see the standards of males with big arms and abs and women as thin and lean as the ideal body type. These standards make it difficult for people on the internet to not compare themselves to these people. Body dysmorphia can cause people to value their appearance over their health. Seeing influencers with great bodies can cause some people to take anabolic steroids in order to look like the people they see online. Seeing your body image negatively can lead to negative behavior, depression and anxiety. Social media fitness can be taken negatively and affect users mental and physical health. To prevent negative effects of fitness social media the consumer should ask the credibility of the creator. Another helpful tip to help with harmful effects of fitness media is to see them as challenges and not make them demotivate you.\

A 2023 study assessed 100 popular Instagram accounts using the hashtag “fitspiration” to examine the credibility of their fitness content. Only 41% met the researchers' criteria for credible content, while other accounts included sexualized imagery, unrealistic body types, or limited fitness-related posts. The findings highlight the importance of evaluating online fitness sources before relying on their content for exercise or health information.

Instagram during COVID-19

During the lockdown many people were stuck inside and unable to go to gyms. This caused a lot of people to gain weight because of the lack of access to gyms, and fear of going outside. Physical fitness during COVID-19 was promoted by personal trainers unable to do their jobs in person so they transferred to online coaching. The isolation and quarantining that came with the virus closed gyms and usual places people go. With people disconnected from their usual routines, these posts helped people stay motivated and keep up with their physical appearance when there was no access to gyms.

In such an environment, hashtags like #homeworkout, #quarantineworkout, and #fitfromhome became popular tools for organizing fitness content, enabling users to discover workouts, share progress, and foster a sense of community despite the physical isolation. Amongst those who gained weight, #quarantine15 also became a trending hashtag, which is a play on the colloquial term "freshman 15" which references weight gain in the first year of college.

A 2023 systematic review examined 19 studies on exercise performed at home during the COVID-19 pandemic. The review found that digital technologies supporting exercise were a useful resource for people who remained physically active during periods of isolation. However, previous activity levels were also associated with whether people exercised at home, meaning digital support alone did not explain participation.

== Reasons for inactivity ==
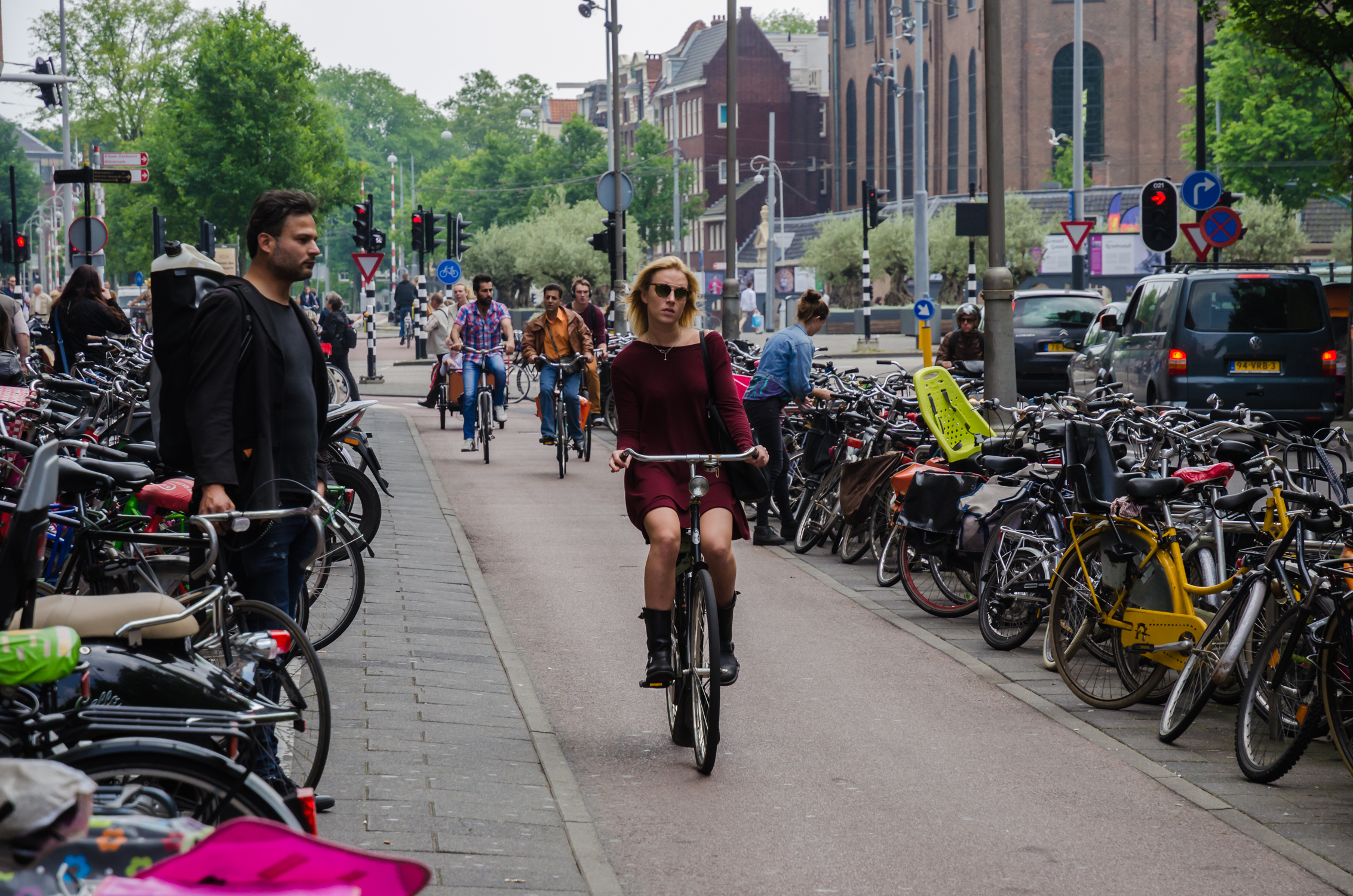
Segregated cycling along a Fietspad in Amsterdam, safe by avoiding conflict with traffic

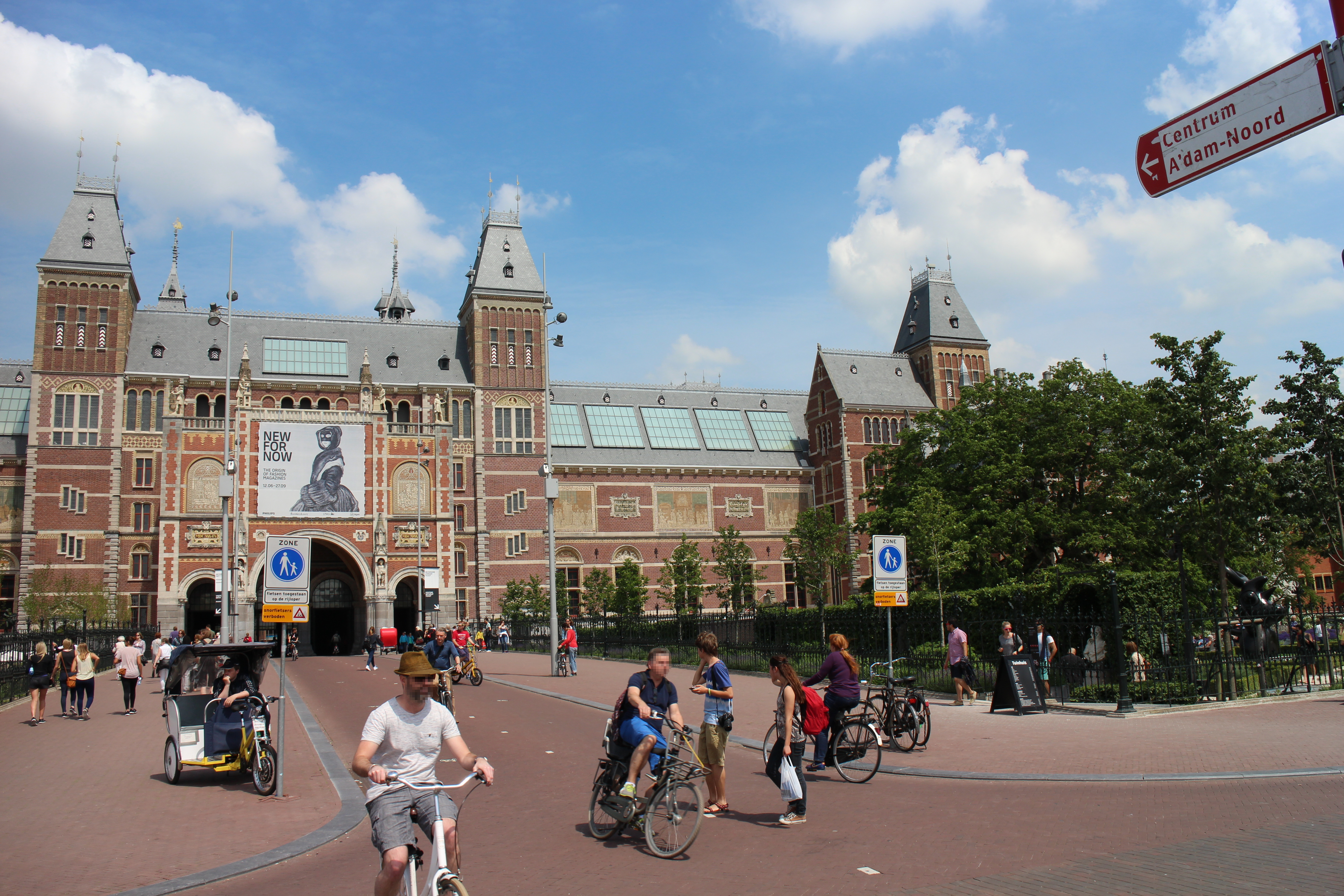
Nederlands Amsterdam: Cycle route through Rijksmuseum in direction of city

In the US, only 26% of adults engage in vigorous leisure-time activity (which includes a sport) or exercising three or more times per week. In an effort to increase adult involvement and decrease the percentage of adult inactivity, the US Department of Health and Human Services has set a national health objective for 2010 that hopes to "Reduce the prevalence of no leisure time activity from more than 25 percent to 20 percent of US adults" (Berlin, Storti, and Brach 1137). In Australia, the Australian Bureau of Statistics found that in 2011/12 adults spent an average of 33 minutes per day doing physical activity with 60% of the population doing less than 30 minutes and fewer than 20% doing an hour or more per day on average. The survey also showed almost 30% of the adult population reporting more than five hours of sedentary leisure activity each day.

Inactivity in young people has been seen to be rising in recent years, and the prevalence of sedentary leisure activities for children is significant. Video games and the internet may play a part in this. It has been found that "26 percent of children and adolescents in the United States spend more than four hours a day watching television, and they have become even more sedentary with access to computers and video games" (Damlo 1434). Along with, "62 percent of children nine to thirteen years of age do not participate in organized physical activities, and 23 percent do not participate in non-organized physical activities outside of school hours" (1434).

One reason for physical inactivity may be the perception that there is nowhere safe to do so. Ways that can help increase the amount of physical activity is to plan and build the environment in a way that makes the population of the community feel safe to be physically active in the area. This could be done for example by slowing speed limits to safer speeds and providing safe street crossings and also by building infrastructure close to the street and pathways with safe pedestrian and cycle access and safe bike parking.

== Initiatives ==
Given the social and economic costs of low levels of physical activity there have been a number of public policy initiatives to raise the level, particularly focusing on children and adolescents.

=== Wellness on wheels ===
The Wear Valley District Council along with its local Durham Dales Primary Care Trust in England developed an innovative scheme in an effort to combat the high levels of poor health and obesity in the area. They created a mobile gym with electronic fitness monitoring equipment, which is called "WOW" (wellness on wheels). The strategy was to take exercise to people's homes rather than waiting for them to use existing leisure facilities.

=== Walking school bus ===
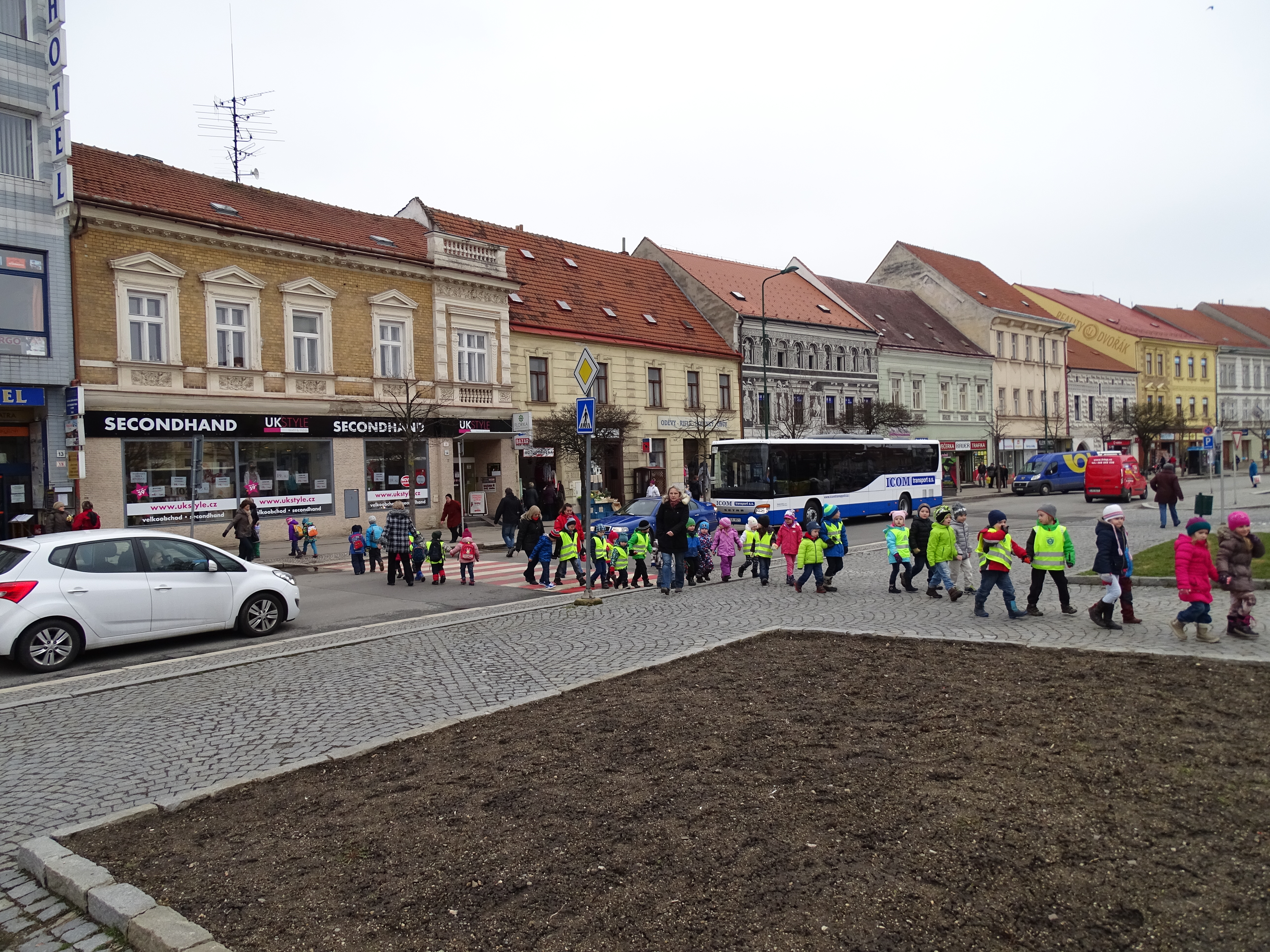
Třebíč-Vnitřní Město, Třebíč District, Vysočina Region, Czechia, Karlovo náměstí

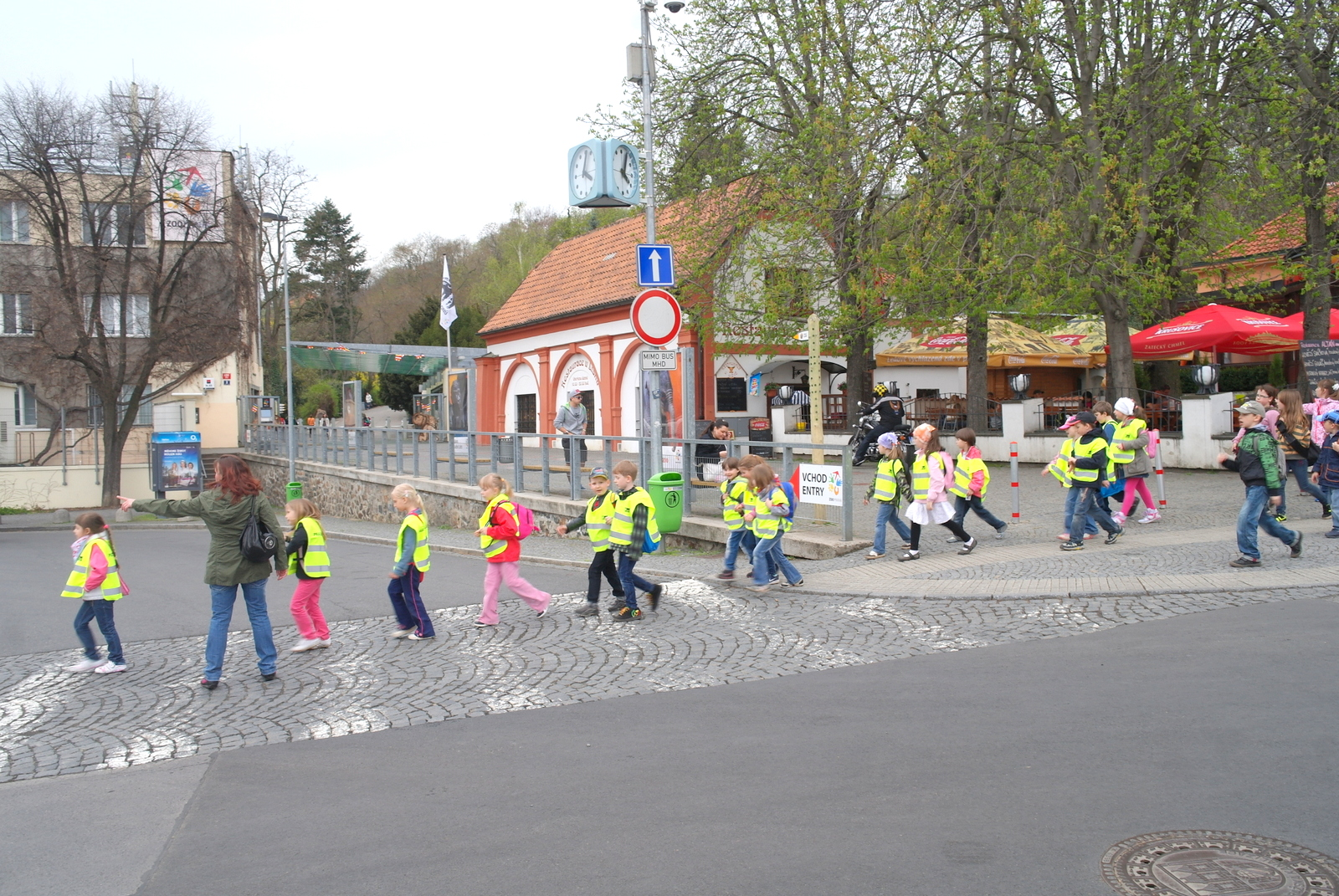
Restaurant U Lišků, originally a country house, U trojského zámku str. 35/9 Troja. At the entrance to the Prague Zoo.

Walking buses have students walking to their designated stops, but they are then chaperoned to school by people walking on foot, rather than taking the school bus.

=== Video games ===
Several video game companies have developed ways to mix the two spectrums of electronic and exercise. Dance Dance Revolution, perhaps the most well-known exercise game, had players earn points by dancing to a beat. Players earn more points for tapping dance pads on the dancing platform at precise times and in proper sequences, thereby incorporating physical exercise.

In 2006 Nintendo introduced the Wii, a next generation game console the features a motion sensitive controller.

== Sedentary behaviour ==
According to Biddle (2007) the social influence of technology, such as electronic gaming and screen time are the main causes towards actions of sedentary behaviour, with TV viewing and computer use being the most prevalent benefactors. However, sedentary behaviours, are not simply "opposites" of physical activity, but instead suggests that they "displace time that would otherwise be used for physical activity".

Children and adolescents, are deemed most at risk for these sedentary behaviours with estimates for youth TV viewing being around "1.8 - 2.8 hours per day". Also Biddle (2007) states that for young people "television took up 40% of the time spent in the five most prevalent sedentary behaviours during the week and 37% at weekends" which stresses the negative impact of these social and technological advances on physical activity and fitness behaviour.

The study Hardy, Dobbins, Booth, Denney, Wilson and Okely (2006) stated that, "there are powerful societal inducements to be inactive and there are increasing concerns of an emerging preference among young people to adopt sedentary lifestyles." Based on Australian adolescents, results were received which indicated that many young people are engaging in sedentary behaviour, with grade 6's spending 34 hours per week, grade 8's with 41 hours and grade 10's with 45 hours.

Another study Zimmit (2010), found a strong, positive association between sedentary behaviours, in particular TV viewing, with obesity and low participation levels. The study stated that in the last 20 years (1990–2010), the prevalence of obesity in Australia has more than doubled. It stresses "public health initiatives targeting the reduction of sedentary pursuits may be necessary to curb the obesity epidemic."

According to the study Martínez-González, Alfredo Martínez, Hu, Gibney, & Kearney, (1999) "Obesity is the most prevalent nutrition-related problem in Western societies, and it is associated with an important burden of suffering in terms of mortality, morbidity and psychological stress". The study stresses that obesity places a severe burden on health care systems, and that obesity could become the leading public health problem in the next century.

== See also ==
- 15 minute city – Urban accessibility concept
- Cycling advocacy – Activities promoting cycling
- Health promotion
- Healthy city – Concept in urban design for health
- Healthy diet
- Human development (biology)
- Human development (psychology)
- Jaywalking
- Lack of physical education
- Maslow's hierarchy of needs
- Personal trainer
- Positive psychology
- President's Council on Physical Fitness and Sports
- Sport psychology
- Street reclamation – Changing streets to focus on non-car use
