= Lack of physical education =

Inadequate provision and effectiveness of physical education in schools

Lack of physical education is the inadequacy of the provision and effectiveness of exercise and physical activity within modern education.

When physical education fails to meet its goals of providing students with the knowledge base, life habits, and mindset necessary to be physically active throughout their lifetime, it can lead children to adopt a sedentary lifestyle. According to a 2010 study by the WHO, 81% of children aged 11–17 worldwide did not meet the minimum recommended exercise guidelines of 60 minutes daily.

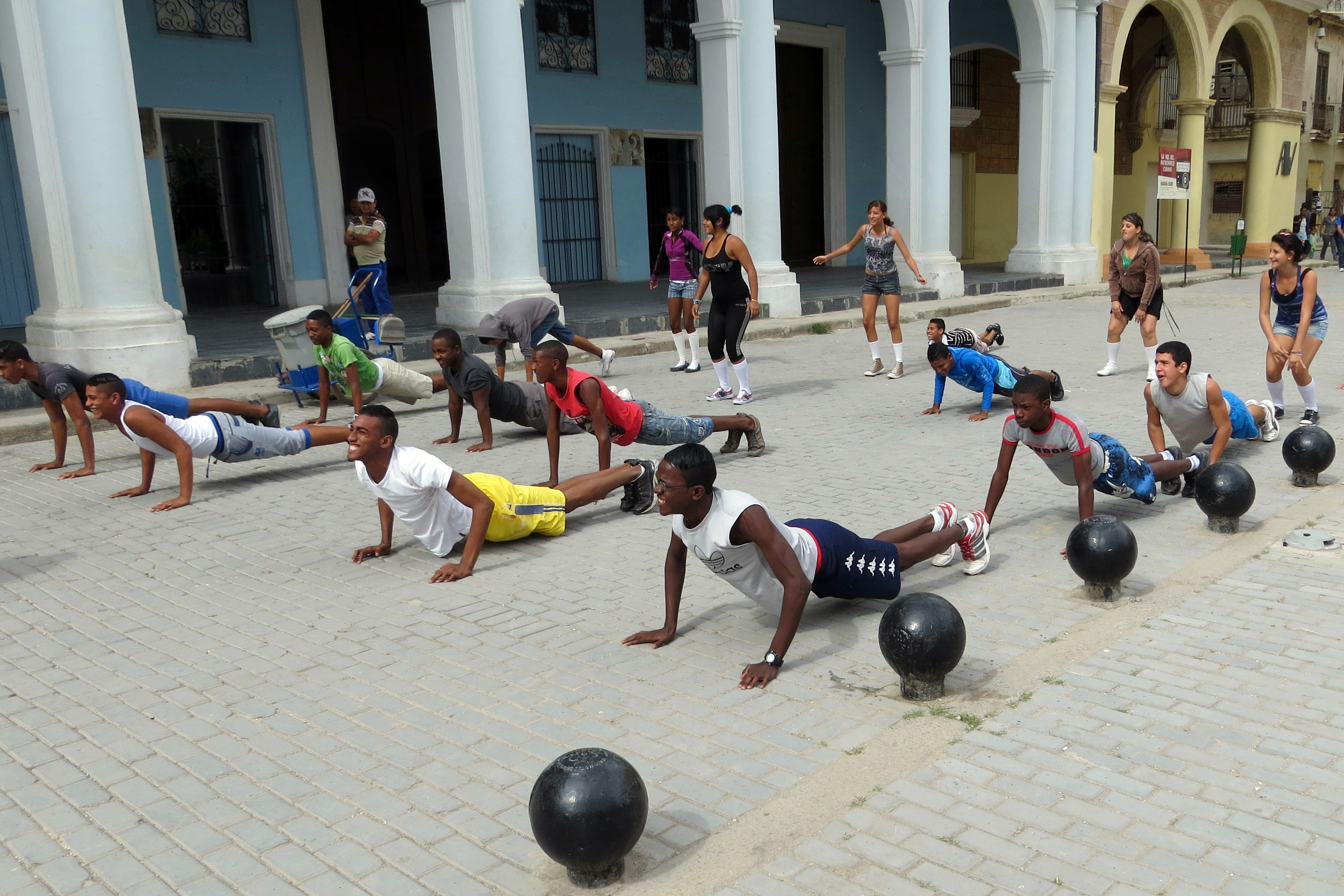
A physical education class for secondary students in Havana, Cuba.

Although more prevalent in countries of high income, physical inactivity is an international issue that is correlated with an obesity epidemic and negative physical, psychological, and academic consequences in children.

A high quality physical education programs consists of these attributes:

- Physical education teachers are certified
- Students in elementary school have physical education class for a minimum of 150 minutes per week, while students in high school have it for at least 225 minutes per week
- Concrete and achievable standards for students to meet (often for high school graduation)

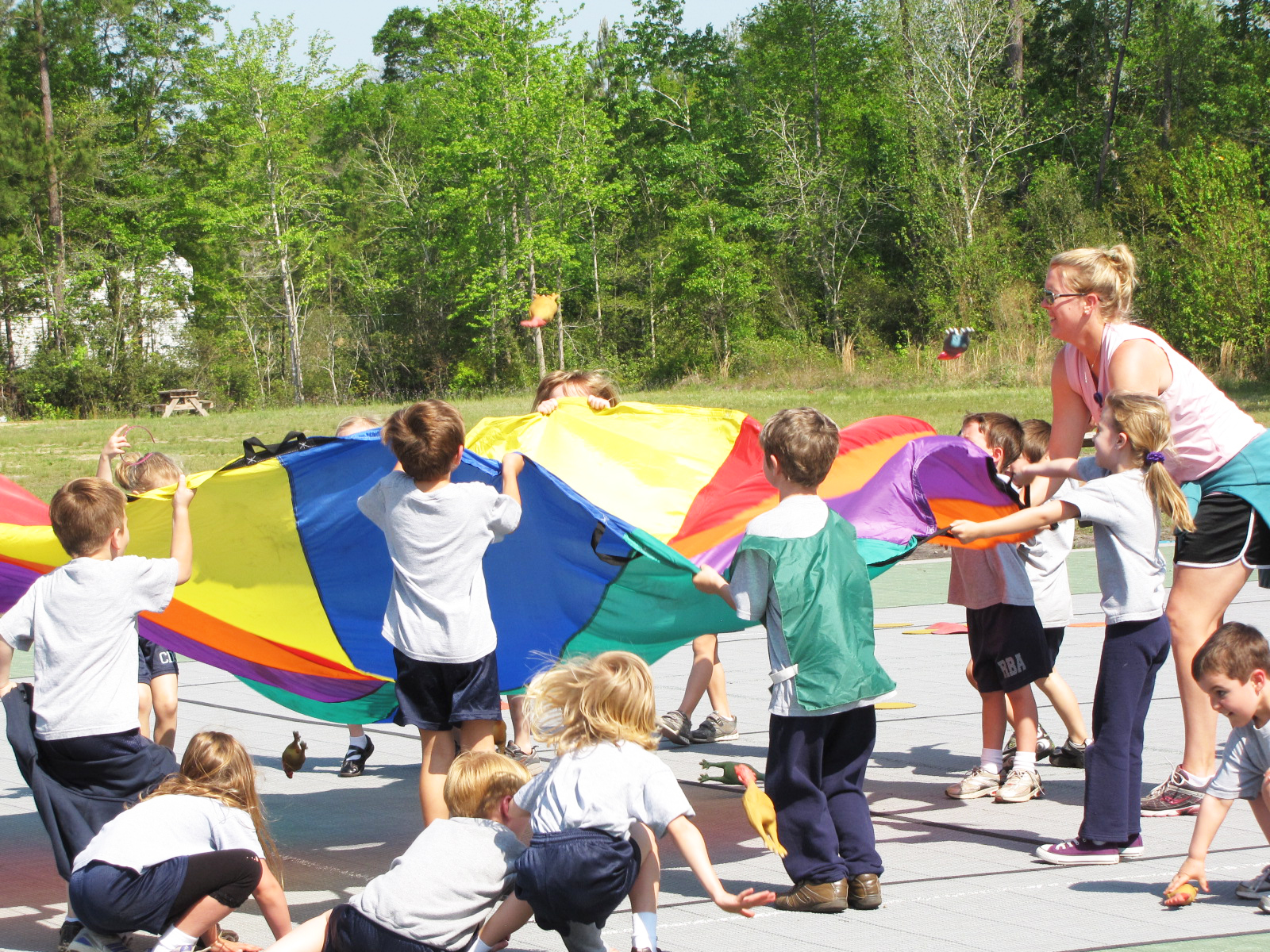
Elementary students playing with a parachute in their physical education class in Leland, North Carolina, U.S.

== Causes ==
The causes of lack of physical education vary from country to country. These include a shortage in facilities and equipment, a paucity of physical education teachers, large class sizes, and budgetary constraints. In some African countries such as Botswana and Malawi, where children attend school for a minimal amount of time, the budgets allocated for physical education are instead used to concentrate on subjects such as languages and mathematics.

A lack of physical education also arises from cultural views: in parts of Central America (such as the Bahamas) and Asia (such as Pakistan), exercise is seen as a form of leisure that should not be featured in an academic curriculum. Another example exists in India, where girls are often discouraged from engaging in sports because such activity is viewed as "unfeminine", as is the possibility of them becoming too muscular.

Moreover, a lack of governmental legislation and intervention can be to blame. In parts of South America (with the exception of Chile and Colombia), there are no laws that make physical education compulsory: thus, it is omitted from many schools.

In other cases, such as in areas of the United States, the mandated physical education hours are simply not met. For example, in 33 states, students are permitted to be exempt from physical education courses by replacing them with other activities such as marching band practices.

Outside of school, children often fail to engage in physical activity due to lack of physical literacy, inadequate sleep, the increasing attractiveness of rival pastimes such as video games, and parents that do not play their part. It is important that parents allow their children the full opportunity to participate in both formal and informal sports and promote healthy physical activity levels. Also, in achievement-oriented populations such as those seen in China, there is an increased emphasis on academic results which also detracts from physical activity time.

The deterioration of physical education in schools combined with the elimination of playgrounds and other play facilities forces children to stay inactive and inside for most of the school day which can have serious long-term consequences.

== Consequences ==
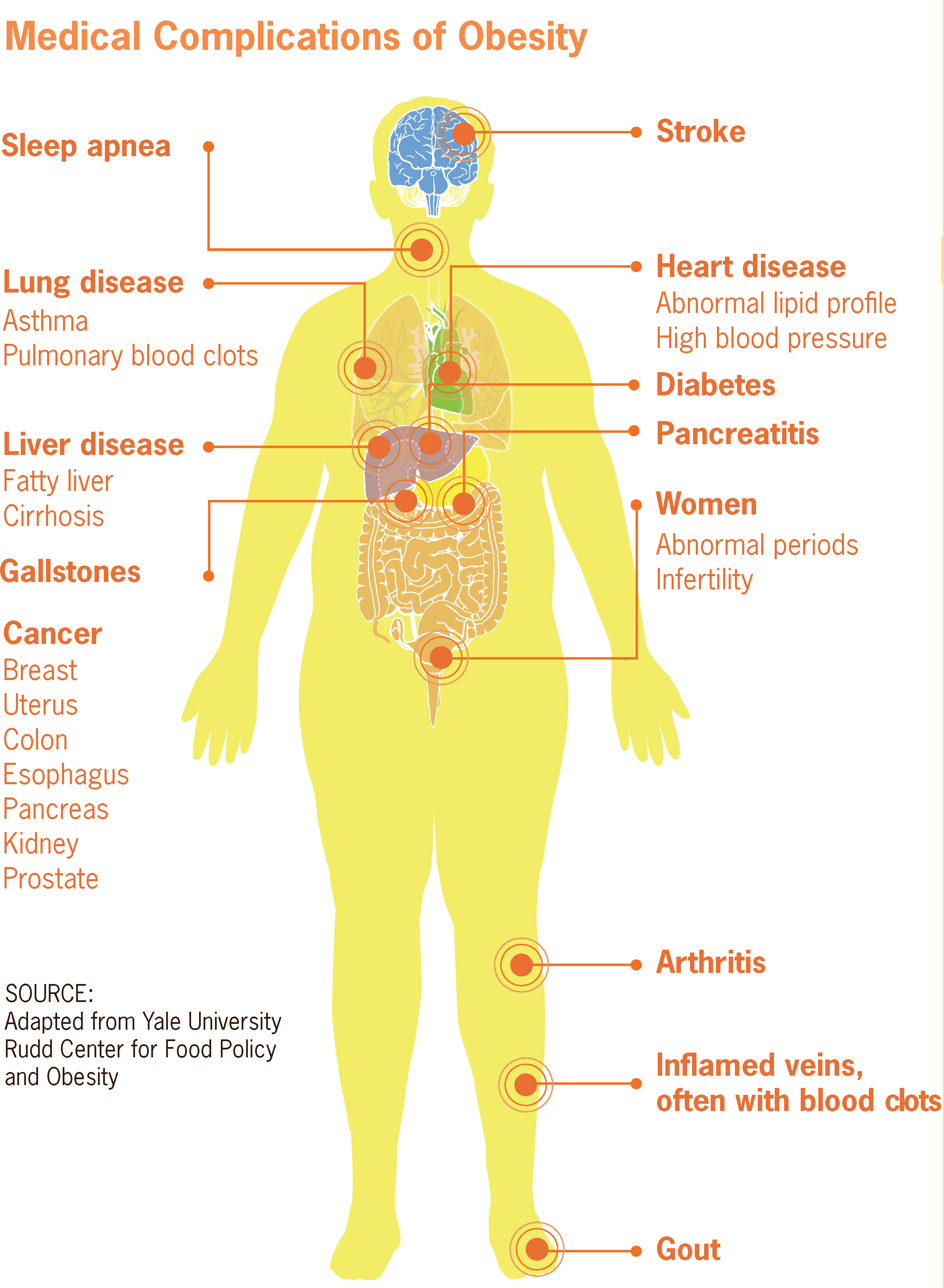
Physical consequences of obesity

An increase in sedentary lifestyle due to a lack of physical education at home and at school has many physical and psychological consequences on a child in the short and long term.

=== Physical ===
According to a Portuguese study, children with sedentary lifestyles have nine times poorer motor coordination than active children of the same age. They also have worsened bone density, strength, and flexibility. In the long term, they are more likely to use tobacco, alcohol, and drugs than their active peers.

Sedentary behaviour is strongly associated with obesity, and this imparts a great health risk. Obese children are more likely to have high blood pressure, heart disease, high LDL cholesterol, Type 2 diabetes mellitus, sleep apnea, menstrual cycle abnormalities, bone and joint problems, increased cancer risk, and reduced balance. They are also more likely to be obese adults.

Childhood physical inactivity has been correlated to cholesterol and fatty streaks in the aorta in the first decade of life and moves to the heart, brain, and other parts of the body in the second and third decade of life, causing health issues.

A lack of physical activity is one of the main causes for obesity, cardiovascular disease, diabetes, and other physical health issues among children and adolescents.

There is a direct correlation between active participation in physical activity and the health of school age children, therefore a lack of physical education would cause a lack in physical activity in children, leading to worse health.

=== Psychological ===
As exercise is known to improve well-being and reduce stress, physical inactivity is correlated with poor psychological health such as an increase of major depression. There is a link between obesity and psychiatric illness and the two feed on each other in a vicious cycle.

A lack of physical activity is associated with poorer concentration and academic performance, particularly in mathematics and reading.

Obesity induced from lack of exercise also contributes to a decrease in general mental health. Overweight children and teens are more likely to suffer from poor self-esteem, negative body image, teasing, and bullying.

Higher levels of sedentary and lower levels of physical education are linked to worse mental health and lower cognitive function among children.

Studies suggest that there is a positive correlation between exercise and cognitive function as it can improve memory, attention, and critical thinking skills. It increases blood flow, which promotes the delivery of more nutrients to the brain. Exercise is also linked to the growth and development of new neurons, supporting overall brain health and function.

== In Canada ==
=== Current trends ===
The majority of Canadian children aged 5 to 17 years old (91%) do not meet the daily physical activity recommendations. Although Canadian physical education programs are improving significantly, with 61-80% of schools offering a minimum of 150 minutes of physical education classes per week in 2016, and participation levels in organized sport are on the rise, Canadian school programs are ineffective in encouraging healthy habits. In fact, most Canadian children (56%) lack physical literacy. Consequently, they face many issues related to lifestyle. These include sedentary behaviours such as increased screen time averaging 176 minutes a day from TVs and video games to the detriment of active play. There is also the inevitable decrease in active transportation, more sleep deprivation, and a poor quality of diet.

These lifestyle trends have caused youth obesity rates to nearly triple over the past 30 years. In 2013, this consisted of 28% of Canadian children ages 5–19 that were classified as overweight or obese.

=== Addressing the Lack of Physical Education ===
==== Recommendations and Regulations ====
The Canadian Association for Health, Physical Education, Recreation and Dance (CAHPERD) has recommended that Canadian schools and school boards take action through specific academic initiatives to ensuring that their physical education curriculum is effective at encouraging and instilling healthy exercise habits in young Canadians. CAHPERD has suggested that schools focus on checking the quality (adequate facilities, budget and research-verified techniques) and quantity (minimum 30 minutes a day) of a school's physical education courses as well as the professional qualifications of the educators. The consultants should check that classes meet the needs of all students irrespective of race, sex, gender, and ability level. The courses should also encourage participation and skill development, with a healthy balance of competitive and noncompetitive activities. Moreover, it is of utmost importance that physical activity and physical education be encouraged by the teacher: they should never be used to punish a student (such as what is seen through the common practice of making children run if they misbehave). Outside of class hours, CAHPERD recommends that schools provide opportunities for intramural activities and involve parents in the fitness initiative.

The Pan-Canadian Public Health Network first decided to prioritize the issue of childhood obesity in September 2010 by creating the framework Curbing Childhood Obesity: An overview of the Federal, Provincial and Territorial Framework for Action to Promote Healthy Weights. In this project, federal, provincial and territorial Ministers of Health agreed to focus on three goals: increasing the predominance of nutritious food choices, addressing obesity at an early age, and creating better spaces for children that favour physical activity and healthy eating. This has allowed the action plan Towards a Healthier Canada to be created.

The Canadian Physical Activity guidelines for children ages 5 to 17 consist of at least 1 hour of daily physical activity. Their exercise should range in intensity from moderate (inducing light perspiration and harder breathing) to vigorous (inducing heavy perspiration and heavy breathing). Examples of moderate exercise include bike riding and playground activities, and examples of vigorous exercise include running and swimming. It is recommended that they engage in both vigorous activities and activities strengthening bone and muscles at least three times a week.

The Canadian Society for Exercise Physiology also recommends that children ages 5 to 17 limit their sedentary activities, such as television and video games, sedentary transport, and extensive sitting. It is advised that children limit their recreational screen time to a maximum of 120 minutes a day.

The Childhood Obesity Foundation, a Canadian initiative, has invented the 5-2-1-0 mnemonic to remember the national lifestyle recommendations. This consists of 5 servings or more of vegetables and fruit per day, no more than 2 hours of screen time a day, 1 hour of physical activity or more per day, and 0 sugary drinks.

Since the inception of Towards a Healthier Canada, many initiatives have been launched to meet the three goals, and they vary from province to province. They are projects made in the name of a framework or jurisdictional approach/governmental department that are either targeted at schools, at a community, or in partnership with other organizations or companies.

== In the United States ==
=== Current Trends ===
Nearly 10 million children and adolescents in the United States ages 6–19 are considered overweight because of the lack of physical education in schools. As of 2007, children aged 6–11 have also more than doubled in rate of obesity over the preceding twenty years.

Individual states have set requirements for physical education in their schools, but how physical education is conducted across the country has not been established. Yet, physical education has been a common practice of the K-12 education curriculum in the United States.

The No Child Left Behind Act has created an environment in which physical education, art and music have been left behind, viewed as "nonessential" courses. Federal funding is more dependent on schools enhancing their math and reading programs.

=== Addressing the Lack of Physical Education ===
==== Regulations and Recommendations ====
One program the United States has adopted to decrease obesity are before-school exercise programs with elementary aged children. One in particular consists of reaching 100 miles before the end of the school year. Each milestone of 25 miles the child will earn a check mark on a tee-shirt. They will then be rewarded at 100 miles with a trophy and an announcement over the school loudspeaker. Walking is supervised by teachers and done around school grounds or inside the school. This is a great way for a child to improve health, concentration, confidence and happiness.

Throughout the past two decades, federal support for physical education in the public health sector has increased dramatically. Since 1992, the Centers for Disease Control and Prevention (CDC) has funded state education agencies to get them to partner with state health departments to promote physical activity and healthy eating in schools among young people.

In February 2010, first lady Michelle Obama started the "Let's Move" initiative to address the childhood obesity epidemic. Efforts to engage in schools to fight against childhood obesity were taken within 1 year of establishing the program.

Budget cuts in the United States have led to less funding and support for physical education because it is not a "core" subject.

== In China ==
=== Current Trends ===
Even though obesity has increased among most of the population in China, the burden of obesity has shifted onto the lower educated population, likely due to a lack of physical education or health education.

Students in China are beginning to gain equal opportunities to physical education and sports to further improve their physical health and strength.

Sport and physical education in China is extremely influenced by Confucianism which emphasizes collectivism. The values it holds emphasizes self-sacrifice and subordination of one's interests to those of others.

=== Addressing the Lack of Physical Education ===
==== Regulations and Recommendations ====
In 2011, The Chinese Ministry of Education has developed standards for physical education in schools. These emphasize enhancing children's health development is the primary goal of physical education in schools. These standards include:

- "Standard 1: Physical activity participation—Students participate in physical activities and are able to enjoy exercise and experience success."
- "Standard 2: Mastery of knowledge, skill, and safe exercise methods—Students learn knowledge about exercise, perform physical skills, understand safe exercise principles, and learn self-defense."
- "Standard 3: Developing physical health—Students learn and master knowledge and method of maintaining health, develop and sustain healthy posture and bodily shape, develop and maintain physical fitness, and improve adaptive ability in natural environments."
- "Standard 4: Developing mental health—Students learn to develop mental strength, control emotions, develop ability to collaborate and cooperate, and follow ethical norms of physical activity."

The General Administration of Sport in China has been one of the leading government agencies that promotes the development of physical education and physical health in the elementary and college levels.

The government has for the most part supported physical education and sport in school, but has often abused it as a political tool which leads to ignoring its importance and the needs of individual students.

== In European (EU) Countries ==
=== Current Trends ===
In the EU, physical education is a mandatory subject in general education. The time dedicated to physical education varies greatly from country to country. About half of EU countries devote 10% of their school curriculum to physical education. Hungary, Croatia and Slovenia devote 15%, while Ireland only 4%.

Out of all EU countries, Scotland devotes the most time to physical education in elementary school, a total of 108 hours, which is only 10% of the total teaching time. Furthermore many benefits come with physical activity. Even if the risks aren't acknowledged they are still there and still pose a threat.

The primary education designers in European countries view physical education as less important than other subjects.

Physical inactivity is responsible for over 500,000 deaths per year in the European Union and accounts for economic costs of over €80 billion per year.

Funding for physical education in EU schools is poor, which has led to poor quality physical education. This lack of funding is reflected in poor quality and lack of equipment at EU schools in respectively 26% and 38% of EU countries.

=== Addressing the Lack of Physical Education ===
==== Regulations and Recommendations ====
In 2007, the European Parliament's Resolution on the Role of Sport in Education helped parliament conclude that physical education is “the only school subject which seeks to prepare children for a healthy lifestyle and focuses on their overall physical and mental development, as well as imparting important social values such as fairness, self-discipline, solidarity, team spirit, tolerance and fair play…” and one of the most important tools for social integration.

European Parliament's Resolution places physical education on the European political agenda, highlighting its importance.

The European Physical Education Association recommends daily physical education in elementary grades up to 10 to 12 years of age and 3 hours per week in post-elementary and high school grades.

== See also ==
- Physical education
- Active design
- Exercise
- Exercise trends
- Sedentary lifestyle
- Fitness professional
- Sport psychology
- Gym
- ParticipACTION

Transport:

- Active mobility
- Automobile dependency
- Effects of the car on societies
- Bike bus
- Walking bus
