= ParticipACTION =

Canadian fitness program

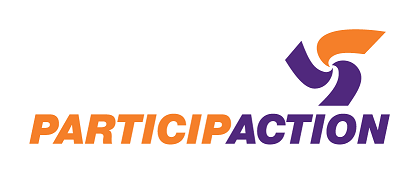
The ParticipACTION logo

ParticipACTION is a national non-profit organization, originally launched as a Canadian government program in the 1970s, to promote healthy living and physical fitness. It shut down due to financial cutbacks in 2001, but was revived on February 19, 2007 with a grant of $5 million from the Canadian federal government.

== History ==
ParticipACTION emerged from Sport Participation Canada, a non-profit organization formed on July 12, 1971 in response to a 1969 study commissioned by the National Advisory Council for Fitness and Amateur Sport that found that the future of Canadian health was at risk from poor physical fitness and apathy on the part of Canadians. Council Chair Philippe de Gaspé Beaubien recommended that the Government of Canada provide seed money for an independent agency with public and private funding that would work to promote physical fitness. Lou Lefaive from Sport Canada was assigned to assist in its founding. Marketing consultant Keith McKerracher was appointed to lead the new organization.

Former Prime Minister of Canada Lester B. Pearson chaired the board from 1971 to 1972, while Philippe de Gaspé Beaubien served as president. In 1972, the company was nationalized by then-Prime Minister Pierre Trudeau to battle exorbitant health care costs. The resulting government program was renamed ParticipACTION.

A 1973 commercial, comparing the health of a 30-year-old Canadian to a 60-year-old Swede, started a national discussion on the state of physical education in Canada. The spot had its origin in juxtaposed pages of a book by Dr. Roy Shephard, then the Director of the Graduate Programme in Exercise Science the University of Toronto. On one page, a table of international fitness comparisons showed Swedes at the top of the ranking and Canadians significantly lower in the list; on the other side, an illustration showed that a sixty-year-old active man could be as fit as a sedentary thirty-year-old. When Russ Kisby (an early hire of McKerracher) showed McKerracher the book, the separate ideas were fused into the famous PSA. The ensuing outcry of alarm and embarrassment triggered a debate in the Parliament of Canada.

In the 1990s ParticipACTION became well known for its television public service announcements (PSAs) such as Body Break hosted by Hal Johnson and Joanne McLeod. The series had been rejected by 40 companies including broadcasters and advertising agencies, including by various broadcasters, including The Sports Network, who weren't interested in showing an interracial couple.

With that frustration, Johnson approached ParticipACTION who agreed to fund the series, funding the first 65 of over 300 episodes. As a result, BodyBreak became a mainstay of Canadian television, including on networks that previously rejected it like TSN. In 2018, ParticipACTION introduced the idea that Everything gets better when you get active to help change the way people think about physical activity, focusing on all the benefits of active living (improved sleep, more energy, better focus). The Everything Gets Better campaign won Shopper Innovation and Marketing awards in 2020. The organization provides guidance to help Canadians achieve whatever “better” they wish to achieve, making physical activity part of Canadians’ everyday lives.

In 2019, the organization launched the ParticipACTION app which distinguishes itself by providing research and evidence-based health and fitness articles along with exercise how-tos in tandem with fitness tracking capabilities. App users receive prizes for doing things like getting active, reading or watching content in the app or sharing these things with others via social media, text or email.

The organization runs a variety of other initiatives as well to support its vision:

- The Community Better Challenge, naming Canada's Most Active Community
- Analysis of the state of physical activity among children & youth, adults and how this compares to other countries
- Programming to help workplaces reduce sedentary behaviour and increase physically active

ParticipACTION was led by President and CEO Kelly Murumets from 2007 until 2014, when Elio Antunes was named to lead the organization.

The series received a burst of international publicity in 2017 when Global Calgary meteorologist Jordan Witzel, who was supposed to present a short segment introducing the playground activity of swinging as the ParticipACTION activity of the day, misinterpreted it as swinging in the sexual sense and expressed his confusion at the inappropriateness of the recommendation before realizing his error.

== See also ==
- Lack of physical education
- Toronto Coalition for Active Transportation
