= Safe Routes to School =

Program encouraging walking and cycling to school

Safe Routes to School programs are a public health initiative in the United States and elsewhere designed to encourage more children to walk or cycle to and from school.

In the US, a Safe Routes to School program was first formed and funded on the national level as part of the 2005 federal transportation bill known as SAFETEA-LU.
