= Active design =

Building and planning promoting physical activity

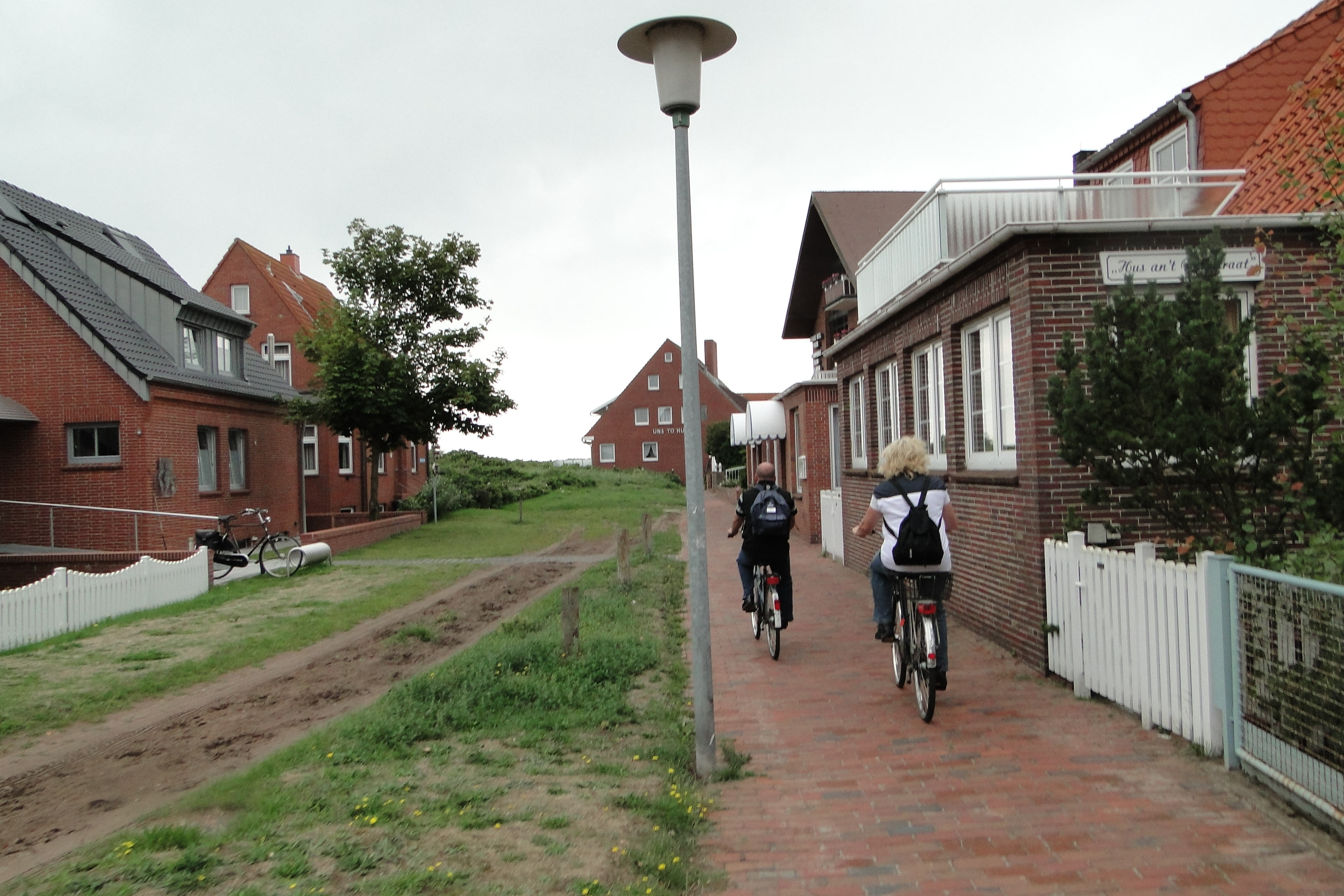
Carfree Juist, Germany

Active design is a set of building and planning principles that promote physical activity. Active design in a building, landscape or city design integrates physical activity into the occupants' everyday routines, such as walking to the store or making a photocopy. Active design involves urban planners, architects, transportation engineers, public health professionals, community leaders and other professionals in building places that encourage physical activity as an integral part of life. While not an inherent part of active design, most designers employing "active design" are also concerned with the productive life of their buildings and their building's ecological footprint.

== History ==
=== In England ===
Sport England considers that the built environment has a vital role to play to encourage people to be physically active as part of their daily lives, enabling communities to lead more active and healthy lifestyles. In 2007 Sport England and David Lock Associates published Active Design, which provided a set of design guidelines to help promote opportunities for sport and physical activity in the design and layout of new development. The guidance was developed in two phases. Phase one (2005) developed the three key active design objects of improving accessibility, enhancing amenity and increasing awareness ("the 3 A's"). Phase two included two stakeholder sessions (May and October 2006) which expanded "the 3 A's" into a criterion-based approach. These criteria formed the guidance which was published in 2007. The guidance was supported by CABE, Department of Health and Department for Culture Media and Sport.

In 2014, Sport England held a stakeholder session made up of a range of bodies and individuals including urban planning and public health professionals to discuss whether active design was still relevant in the current planning and health context, and they concluded that it was. The guide was revised, retaining "the 3 A's" and refining the criteria-based approach to the ten principles of active design. The revised Active Design was published in 2015, and was supported by Public Health England.

In 2016 Active Design: Planning for Health and Wellbeing through Sport and Physical Activity was shortlisted for an award at the Royal Town Planning Institute (RTPI) Awards for Planning Excellence. Active Design was shortlisted in the category of "Excellence in Planning for Community and Wellbeing".

In 2017 Sport England prepared two animated films, Active Design by Sport England and The Ten Principles of Active Design, in addition to three further case studies.

The active design principles are becoming increasingly embedded into built environment practice and placemaking design, with a growing list of local authorities in England making reference to Sport England's active design guidance in planning policy. In 2018 active design was embedded into the principles of the revised "Essex Design Guide" (prepared by Essex County Council and supported by Sport England).

=== In New York ===
Recognizing that physical inactivity was a significant factor in decreased life spans, notably because it promoted obesity, high blood pressure and high blood glucose, all precursors of early death, those responsible for planning in New York City developed a set of guidelines that, among other things, they hoped would promote health by promoting physical activity. They released these guidelines in January 2010. The guidelines were also based on concerns about building longevity and ecological costs, which is generally known as "sustainable design". Impetus for the guidelines began in 2006 with the NYC Department of Health and Mental Hygiene (DOHMH) who then partnered with the American Institute of Architects New York Chapter to hold a series of conferences known as the "Fit City" conferences.

Four key concepts came out of this process:

1. Buildings should encourages greater physical movement within them for users and visitors
2. Cities should provide recreational spaces that are accessible and encourage physical activity for a variety of ages, interests, and abilities
3. Transportation systems in cities should encourage physical activity and should protect non-motor vehicle use
4. Cities, market areas and buildings should provide ready access to food and healthy eating environments

From New York City the active design movement spread throughout the United States and the world.

== Goals ==
Sickness can lead to not working efficiently and effectively. Ineffective workers in the work force cause harm to the company and the people in the community. Active design strives to impact public health not only physically but also mentally and socially. For example, active design in transportation supports a safe and vibrant environment for pedestrians, cyclists and transit riders. It creates buildings that encourage greater physical movement within a building by both users and visitors. The active design of recreation sites shapes play and activity spaces for people of different ages, interests, and abilities. Also, improved food accessibility can improve nutrition in communities that need it the most.

== Effects ==
There are few studies of the effects of implementing active design concepts, but they are in general agreement that the physical activity of occupants is increased. Moving to an active design building seemed to have physical health benefits for workers, but workers' perceptions on productivity about the new work environment have varied. A study reported that staff moved into an active design building decreased the time spent sitting by 1.2 hours per day. There was no significant increase in self-rated quality of work or work related motivation but there was no negative feedback in these areas.

The National Institute for Health and Care Research (NIHR) has published a review of research on public health interventions to prevent obesity. The review covers interventions looking at active travel (including walk and cycle lanes), the impact of new roads, public transport, access to green spaces, blue spaces, and parks, and urban regeneration.

== Implementation ==
Active design concepts may be applied in remodeling or repurposing existing buildings and landscapes. Some elements include widening sidewalks and crosswalks; installing traffic calming elements that slow driving speeds; making stairs that are accessible, visible, attractive, and well-lit; making recreation areas, such as parks, plazas, and playgrounds, more accessible by pedestrians and cyclists. People would be more likely to be active if places for recreation were within walking distance.

There are a number of concerns with the adoption of active design programmes. Developing communities are not always accepting of new forms of architecture and living. Integration of active design may come in conflict with making sure historical culture survives. Vernacular architecture may be abandoned due to it being considered insufficient or uncomfortable.

== Future ==
The future of active design may be to further incorporate requirements into law, as in the city of New York which set active design guidelines to improve public health in the city.

== See also ==
- Car-free movement
- Cycling infrastructure
- Street reclamation
- Walkability
- Walking audit
