= Society for Nutrition Education and Behavior =

Other organization in Indianapolis, United States

The Society for Nutrition Education and Behavior (SNEB) is an American non-profit organization that represents the professional interests of nutrition educators in the United States and worldwide. The organization was founded as the Society for Nutrition Education in 1968 as a non-profit organization to publish the Journal of Nutrition Education. Once the Journal was established the Society expanded its purposes to include education, communication and research activities. The first issue of the Journal was published as "Summer" in 1969.

== History ==
The founding members of SNEB were: George M Briggs, PhD, Professor and Chair, Department of Nutritional Sciences, University of California at Berkeley; Ruth L. Huenemann, ScD, RD, Associate Professor of Public Health Nutrition, School of Public Health, University of California at Berkeley; George F. Stewart, PhD, Director, Food Protection and Toxicology Center, University of California at Davis; Hellen Denning Ullrich, MA, RD, Nutrition Specialist, Agricultural Extension Service, University of California Berkeley; Helen E. Walsh, MA, RD, Chief, Bureau of Nutrition, State Department of Public Health, Berkeley; and Gaylor P. Whitlock, PhD, Program Leader, Family and Consumer Sciences, Agricultural Extension Service, University of California Berkeley.

The name of the Journal was changed to the Journal of Nutrition Education and Behavior in January 2002. The official publication for the Society, JNEB is a refereed, scientific periodical that serves as a resource for all professionals with an interest in nutrition education as well as dietary and physical activity behaviors. The purpose of JNEB is to document and disseminate original research, emerging issues, and practices relevant to nutrition education and behavior worldwide. The content areas of JNEB reflect the diverse interests of health, nutrition, education, cooperative extension and other professionals working in areas related to nutrition education and behavior. As the Society's official journal, JNEB also includes occasional policy statements, issue perspectives, and member communications. SNEB publishes JNEB with Elsevier.

In January 2012 the Society changed its name to the Society for Nutrition Education and Behavior.

The United Nations granted SNEB special consultative status with the Economic and Social Council (ECOSOC) in July 2018. Organizations with such status can be contacted by the ECOSOC for expert information and advice related to nutrition education.

== Mission ==
The organization's mission statement says the Society advances nutrition education food and nutrition education research, practice, and policy that promote equity and support public and planetary health. Members of SNEB educate families, fellow professionals, students, communities, and policy makers about nutrition, food, and health.

SNEB adopted the definition of nutrition education as defined by Dr. Isobel Contento: Nutrition education is any combination of educational strategies, accompanied by environmental supports, designed to facilitate voluntary adoption of food choices and other food- and nutrition-related behaviors conducive to health and well-being. Nutrition education is delivered through multiple venues and involves activities at the individual, community and policy levels.

== Society for Nutrition Education and Behavior Foundation (SNEBF) ==
The Society for Nutrition Education and Behavior Foundation, a 501c3 non-profit organization, was started in 1977 to support the next generation of nutrition educators. The foundation operates four scholarship programs, distributing 7-10 scholarships annually.

== International Conference ==
SNEB hosts a conference each summer for nutrition educators, attracting 500-700 attendees from around the world. The next conference will be held at the University of Tennessee in Knoxville, July 29-August 1, 2024.

Past Conferences:

- 2023: Washington, DC
- 2022: Atlanta, GA
- 2020: Virtual
- 2019: Orlando, FL
- 2018: Minneapolis, MN
