= Isobel Contento =

American nutrition educator and academic

Isobel R. Contento
- Citizenship: American
- Education: University of Edinburgh (BSc); University of California, Berkeley (MA, PhD)
- Awards: Helen Denning Ullrich Award for Lifetime Excellence in Nutrition Education (2012)
- Scientific career
- Fields: Nutrition education, behavioral nutrition, Health education
- Workplaces: Teachers College, Columbia University; University of Redlands

Isobel R. Contento is an American nutrition educator and academic. She is the Mary Swartz Rose Professor Emerita of Nutrition and Education at Teachers College, Columbia University, where she directed the Program in Nutrition from 1985 to 2019 and was awarded emerita status following her retirement in 2021.

She is the author, and later co-author with Pamela A. Koch, of Nutrition Education: Linking Research, Theory, and Practice, a textbook examining the design and evaluation of nutrition education programs.

== Early life and education ==
Contento studied at the University of Edinburgh, where she received a B.Sc. with honors. She earned an M.A. and Ph.D. from the University of California, Berkeley.

Before joining Teachers College, Contento taught biology and nutrition at Johnston College, an experimental college associated with the University of Redlands in California. She joined Teachers College in 1977 and subsequently developed her academic work around nutrition education and the behavioral factors associated with food choice.

== Career ==
Contento joined the faculty of Teachers College in 1977. She became director of its Program in Nutrition in 1985 and held that position until 2019. She was appointed Mary Swartz Rose Professor of Nutrition and Education in 1999 and became professor emerita in 2021.

Her research has examined behavioral aspects of nutrition, factors influencing food choice among children and adolescents, the role of family and environment in eating behavior, and the design and evaluation of nutrition education programs. Her work has also addressed school-based interventions involving classroom instruction, physical activity, and school meals. She has worked on nutrition education interventions linking food, health, science, and food systems. She also contributed to the development and evaluation of nutrition education programs including *In Defense of Food*, *Food, Health & Choices*, and other school- and community-based interventions.

Contento has been active in the Society for Nutrition Education and Behavior (SNEB) serving as president of its foundation from 2017 to 2019. She has served on advisory and expert panels concerned with nutrition education and school nutrition, including National Academy of Sciences, the United States Department of Agriculture, and the Centers for Disease Control and Prevention. She was a member of a Food and Agriculture Organization team involved in developing recommendations on nutrition education in low- and middle-income countries.

== Research ==
Contento's work has examined how psychological, social, and environmental factors influence eating behavior and how these factors can be incorporated into nutrition education programs.

Contento has also participated in research involving nutrition interventions for breast cancer survivors, including culturally tailored dietary and physical-activity interventions for Latina women.

Contento is the author, and later co-author with Pamela Koch, of the textbook *Nutrition Education: Linking Research, Theory, and Practice*. The book presents a framework for designing nutrition education programs based on research evidence and behavioral theory and has appeared in multiple editions and translations. She also co-authored a 2019 article describing the application of the Nutrition Education DESIGN Procedure to the development of the In Defence of Food curriculum.

In 1995, Contento and colleagues published a review of research on the effectiveness of nutrition education and its implications for policy and program development.

In a 2008 article in the Asia Pacific Journal of Clinical Nutrition, she discussed findings from an analysis of more than 300 studies and argued that nutrition education was more likely to influence dietary behavior when interventions addressed behavior and action rather than knowledge alone.

== Awards and honors ==
In 2012, Contento received the Helen Denning Ullrich Award for Lifetime Excellence in Nutrition Education from the Society for Nutrition Education and Behavior. She shared the award with Patricia Britten.

In 2022, Contento was a recipient of the Outstanding Achievement Award presented by the International Academy of Nutrition Educators.

Contento is the author of Nutrition Education: Linking Research, Theory, and Practice, first published by Jones & Bartlett in 2007. The book presents the Nutrition Education DESIGN Procedure, a framework for planning and evaluating behaviorally focused nutrition education programs.
