= Ruth Huenemann =

Public health nutrition expert

- Ruth Lois Huenemann
- Born: February 5, 1910; Waukon, Iowa
- Died: August 19, 2005 (aged 95)
- Occupation: Professor University of California, Berkeley
- Years active: 1941-1974
- Known for: Nutrition expert
- Notable work: The Berkeley Teenage Study (1961–1965)

Ruth Lois Huenemann (February 5, 1910 – August 19, 2005) was an American public health nutritionist. She was a pioneer in the study of childhood obesity. Huenemann was a professor at the University of California, Berkeley and she was the chair of the Department of Social and Administrative Health Sciences in the School of Public Health.

== Early life and education ==
Huenemann was born February 5, 1910, in Waukon, Iowa, United States. She grew up in both Wisconsin and South Dakota. She was the second of 14 children born to a farming family. She and her siblings were tall and slender. She graduated high school in 1928. During the Great Depression she became a teacher. She attended the University of Wisconsin and graduated in 1938 with a bachelor's degree in nutrition. In 1941, she graduated from the University of Chicago with a master's degree in nutrition. She taught for a decade at the University of Tennessee as an associate professor. She received a scholarship to attend Harvard University. In 1954 she earned her doctorate from Harvard University.

== Career ==
In 1953, Huenemann was hired on at the School of Public Health at the University of California, Berkeley. She was the chair of the Department of Social and Administrative Health Sciences in the School of Public Health. She was the head of the Department of Nutritional Sciences. She was the founder of the public health nutrition program at UC Berkeley. She became a pioneer in the study of childhood obesity in the 1960s studying the diet and exercise habits of Berkeley teenagers.

In one of her studies: The Berkeley Teenage Study (1961–1965), she followed 1000 Berkeley Unified School District students in an attempt to determine the development and causes of obesity. The study determined that some students were already obese in their early teen years. Next she began the Berkeley Longitudinal Nutrition Study which studied children six months to sixteen years. It is study of growth and development which assists current efforts to understand obesity.

In 1967 she co-authored a paper titled "Caloric and Nutrient Intakes of Teen-Agers". It was the third report in the series of “A Longitudinal Study of Gross Body Composition and Body Conformation and Their Association with Food and Activity in a Teen-Age Population.”

From 1969 to 1973, she led the study which was referred to as the Berkeley Longitudinal Nutrition Study. The study followed children from six months of age to 16 years of age. At the time it as unusual to study a group for such a long period of time. She studied teenaged children to learn their eating habits, activity and body type. She endeavored to learn which wide-ranging factors could have influenced the development of obesity. Her study was one of the first to make a connection between socioeconomic status and obesity. The study learned that teenagers were getting less exercise because of television and automobiles. The study also showed that overweight babies do not necessarily become overweight adults: activity level is much more predictive of future weight.

== Selected works ==
- Huenemann, Ruth L. (1974). Teenage nutrition and physique. Springfield Illinois: Thomas. ISBN 978-0398031350.
