= Strategic Environmental Assessment (Denmark) =

The Strategic Environmental Assessment (SEA), is a process in Denmark for assessing the environmental effects of proposed government projects and programmes. Established in 1993 by an administrative order of Denmark's Prime Minister's Office, this requirement was not initially enshrined in law, but was supported by a government circular which required an SEA to be carried out on “government proposals with major environmental effects”. The SEA process was limited only to government proposals and did not extend to plans and programmes. SEAs were required to focus on the impacts proposals would have on physical, ecological, cultural, health and risk factors. In 1995, the SEA requirement was extended to new parliamentary acts in addition to government proposals at the national level.

== Initial administrative order ==
The administrative order broadly outlined four steps in the SEA process.

1. Screening – using the checklist contained in the guidance (water, air, climate, surface of the earth, soil, flora and fauna, landscape, resources, waste, historical buildings, population health, safety and transport of harmful substances) proposals that were likely to have a significant environmental impact had to be identified.

2. Scoping – the cumulative effects of a bill or policy had to be identified.

3. Assessment – analysis of the effects that had been identified as significant in the previous stages. Crucially the guidance stated that it was not possible to give an overall description, so a list of factors to be referenced were included in the guidance.

4. Report – a separate report of the environmental effects had to be included, attached to the bill that was to be put before parliament. The report had to be non-technical and easy to understand – it also had to be made available to the public.

=== Legal Framework ===
The SEA Directive (2001/42/EC) was integrated into the Danish planning system in 2004. The SEA Directive now ensures that SEA has been extended to plans and programmes, rather than just government proposals. The Act on the Environmental Assessment of Plans and Programmes (Danish SEA Act) was passed into law in May 2004 and “is strictly in accordance with the requirements of the [2001/42/EC] directive”.

The SEA Act allows the Minister for the Environment a certain amount of discretion (as the administrative order of 1993 did), with the Minister able to determine whether or not a private or publicly owned company is required to carry out a SEA on their plan or programme, when they are acting in the capacity of a public authority (for example, the provision of utilities).

It is also important to note that the SEA Act can be overruled, as long as a plan or programme complies with the procedural and substantive requirements of the SEA Directive. This helps to avoid duplication with “land use plans that have been prepared in accordance with the [Danish] Planning Act”.

=== Guidance Documents ===
Despite the integration of the SEA Directive, SEA guidance was restricted to a publication called Strategic Environmental Assessment of Bills and Other Proposals: Examples and Experience issued in 1995 by the Ministry for the Environment. New guidance was prepared in 2002, but never published due to a change in government. The 1995 guidance issues a six step approach with regards to the type of information that should be included within an SEA

- Formulating the problem and describing the process of the proposal and the alternatives that have been considered
- Identifying the relevant environmental effects
- Describing the extent of the likely environmental effects
- Identifying mitigation measures and monitoring follow up programmes
- assessing and weighing the environmental effects in relation to policy objectives
- A statement with the summary of the main findings

In 2006, The Environment Ministry released up to date guidance that related to the SEA requirements for plans and programmes dating from 2004. Instruction number 9664 entitled 'Vejledning om miljøvurdering af planer og programmer' replaced the earlier guidance dating from 1995. The new guide was later supplemented, in 2007, by examples of SEAs that had been conducted.

=== SEA steps required ===
SEA steps that are required are defined by the SEA Act and supplemented by the guidance.

The table sets out the specific SEA process as defined by 2006 and 2007 guidance from the Danish Ministry of the Environment. The process is broadly split into nine main stages:

Stage	Danish	English
1	Screening	Screening
2	Scoping	Scoping (includes consultation)
3	Miljobeskyttelsesmal	Legal Obligations for protection of the environment (national and international)
4	Vurdering af konsekvenser og afbodning	Prediction/Evaluation of consequences (of a plan or programme) on the environment
5	Alernativer	Alternatives/Mitigation
6	Overvagning	Other programmes (examples of)
7	Miljorapport og formidling	Environmental protection measures
8	Sammenfattende redegorelse	Summary and Explanation
9	Organisering (af miljovurderingsarvejdet)	Monitoring environmental effects

== Examples of SEAs produced so far ==
Examples of Danish SEAs carried out following the introduction of the EU SEA Directive are “so far few". Below are some examples of SEA that have been produced prior to the introduction of the EU SEA Directive.

=== North Jutland Regional Development Plan (1995-1997) ===
This was the very first SEA to be carried out in Denmark and was carried out before the introduction of the EU SEA Directive. As a result of this pilot SEA, the major concern amongst stakeholders was reconciling negative environmental impacts that resulted from planning activities. Overall, while stakeholders felt that no new knowledge was gained from carrying out an SEA, the planning process became more transparent. Politicians felt that there was more information on which they could make an informed decision about the choices presented to them. It was also decided that consultation should be carried out during the scoping process, rather than at later stages of the SEA process.

=== Regional groundwater plan for Vejle County, Eastern Jutland (2002) ===
This SEA was carried out as a consequence of the regional planning process (which included the requirement for SEAs) and is notable for the alternatives suggested. Groundwater extraction takes places beneath polluted urban areas and two strategies were devised – ’cleaning up’ or extracting water from rural areas. The resulting analysis found there was no clear best solution and therefore other factors, such as economic considerations, should be taken into account to aid the decision-making process.

=== Regional mineral extraction plan for Vejle County (2003) ===
Extraction of minerals controlled under the plan were assessed under six criteria – transportation, economy, changes in landscape, landscape dynamics, pollution suffered by local residents and stress factors for local residents. This SEA clearly influenced the decision-making process as the decision on the best alternative was deferred until suitable mitigation measures could be found.

== Strengths and Weaknesses of the SEA system ==
=== Strengths ===
Before the implementation of the SEA Directive into the Danish planning system, there had been a long history of consideration of the environmental effects that a planning process may have. Therefore, the transposition of the SEA Directive into Danish legislation conforms fully, and the supporting guidance (albeit late) ensures that SEAs conducted should be directive compliant. This historical approach has ensured that the SEA process has been institutionalised into the planning process. This ensures that environmental considerations are the subject of political debates and that parliamentary bills are prepared adequately with the SEA Directive and Danish SEA Act in mind.

The SEA process in Denmark is transparent and SEAs have a discernible influence upon the decision-making process (Jones et al., 2005). There is a long tradition of public participation in the Danish planning system and this philosophy is no exception with regards to the SEA system. This is coupled with a feeling among planners and stakeholders, that despite the costs of SEA, overall it is a worthwhile and productive process.

=== Weaknesses ===
The major weakness in the Danish SEA system largely relates to government ministries – this is ironic given that they are responsible for the integration of the SEA Directive into Danish legislation.

- There is a lack of satisfactory scoping procedure when ministries prepare bills and conduct environmental assessments.
- There is an administrative failure of ministries excluding negative effects and including only positive effects.
- Political adaptation of environmental assessments often takes place within ministries, sometimes with the result that information on the environmental impact of bills is not submitted to Parliament.
- Further consideration should be given to how the public could play a more attentive role in the SEA process to help overcome issues of stakeholder dominance and political short-sightedness.
- The development of SEA at the plan and programme level should be monitored to evaluate its contribution on the policy level and to identify how the practice on both levels could complement and stimulate each other.

Monitoring systems currently in place need to be strengthened. Currently monitoring of environmental impacts is done only through informal communication instead of the Minister for the Environment issuing specific rules.

== See also ==
- Environmental impact assessment
- Strategic Environmental Assessment
- Social Impact Assessment
- Healthy development measurement tool
