= Leopold matrix =

Environmental impact assessment method

The Leopold matrix is a qualitative environmental impact assessment method developed in 1971 by Luna Leopold and collaborators for the USGS. It is used to identify and assign numerical weightings to potential environmental impacts of proposed projects on the environment. It came as a response to the National Environmental Policy Act of 1969 which was criticized for lacking adequate guidance for government agencies on how to properly predict potential environmental impacts and consequently prepare impact reports.

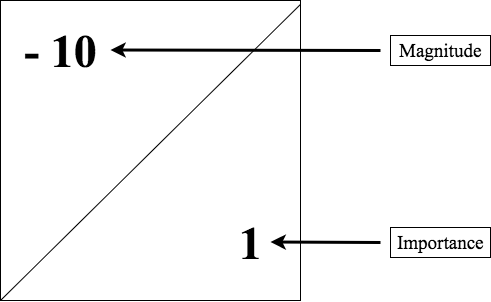
An Example Showing the Location of Magnitude and Importance Values in a Leopold Matrix Cell

The system consists of a grid of 100 rows representing the possible project activities on the horizontal axis and 88 columns representing environmental factors on the vertical axis, for a total of 8800 possible interactions. In practice, only a select few (25-50) of these interactions are likely to be of sufficient importance to be thoroughly considered. Where an impact is expected, the appropriate cell of the matrix is split diagonally from the top right corner to the bottom left corner in order for the magnitude and importance of each interaction to be recorded. The magnitude (from -10 to +10) is inserted on the top-left diagonal and the importance (from 1 to 10) is inserted on the bottom-right diagonal. Measurements of magnitude and importance tend to be related, but do not necessarily directly correlate. Magnitude can be measured more tangibly in terms of how much area is affected by the development or how severely, however, the importance is a more subjective measurement. While a proposed development may have a large impact in terms of magnitude, the effects it causes may not actually significantly affect the environment as a whole. The example given by author Luna Leopold is of a stream that significantly alters the erosion patterns in a specific area, which may be scored highly in terms of magnitude but may not be necessarily significant, provided the stream in question is swift-moving and transports large amounts of sediment regardless. In this case, an impact of significant magnitude may not actually be important to the environment in question.

== Strengths ==
As outlined by the original authors, the matrix provides a structured framework for practitioners of environmental impact assessment to systematically rank potential significant environmental cause-and-effect relationships. A structured approach avoids the downsides of less organized ad hoc approaches to impact prediction in which impacts can be either underestimated or completely overlooked. Additionally, the grid format allows for a visual display of results that can be easily understood by policymakers and the public. The matrix is also capable of expanding and contracting based on the scope and environmental context of any given undertaking, rendering it functional for both large and small-scale projects. Finally, it is beneficial to practitioners that the tool can be applied at various temporal stages of the environmental impact assessment process.

== Criticisms ==
One of the fundamental downfalls of the method is the lack of criteria or standard methods for assigning magnitude and significance values which may lead to subjective judgements. In the same vein, the method has also been identified as lacking the ability to facilitate any degree of public involvement, primarily due to the subjective value judgements of the user. Another potential pitfall is the sheer size of the matrix with a total of 17 600 items of information potentially being analyzed. The size of the matrix has also been criticized as being too detailed for some projects while simultaneously being too imprecise for others. In terms of direct content, the chance of double-counting certain impacts is also present. The matrix has further been identified as being highly biased toward biophysical impacts making the social impacts of a given project difficult to assess. Of the impacts that are covered, the matrix is seldom capable of taking into consideration secondary or cumulative impacts which are often significant considerations in environmental impact assessment. Another area that the method can be deficient in is having a mechanism capable of distinguishing between long-term impacts and short-term impacts. Due to the presentation of completed matrices, the method has also been identified as treating interactions as though they are certain to occur, with no consideration of probability.

== Examples of Leopold Matrix Implementation ==
- Gonabad landfill; a study conducted to evaluate the environmental effects of a municipal waste landfill site.
- Vojvodina ecological network; an assessment of the influences of anthropogenic factors on an ecological network (salt steppes, marshes, etc.).
- Karbala water projects; a study on seven drinking water treatment facilities based on physio-chemical properties.
- Binh Thuan desertification; an assessment of the potential desertification effects and subsequent impacts on socio-economic conditions and water availability.

== See also ==
- Environmental Impact Assessment – Assessment of the environmental consequences of a decision before action
- Strategic Environmental Assessment – Procedure to evaluate environmental impact
- Social Impact Assessment – Reviews infrastructure and development
- Impact Assessment – Evaluations of public policy proposals before passage
- Risk assessment – Estimation of risk associated with exposure to a given set of hazards
- Precautionary Principle – Risk management strategy
- International Association for Impact Assessment – International organization
- Healthy development measurement tool – Evaluates impact of urban development
