= Equality impact assessment =

An equality impact assessment (EqIA) is a process designed to ensure that a policy, project or scheme does not unlawfully discriminate against any protected characteristic.

== Definition ==
The EqIA process aims to prevent discrimination against people who are members of a protected category. The Equality Act 2010 defines 9 protected characteristics:

- Race
- Religion or Belief
- Disability
- Sex
- Gender Reassignment
- Sexual Orientation
- Age
- Marriage or Civil Partnership
- Pregnancy and Maternity

Within the UK, EqIAs is a means of ensuring that the public sector equality duty is met. On 19 November 2012, then Prime Minister David Cameron announced that EqIAs would no longer be undertaken for government decisions.

== See also ==
- Social Impact Assessment
- Environmental Impact Assessment
- Health Impact Assessment
- Sustainability Appraisal
- Equality Act 2006
- Equality Act 2010
- Equal Opportunity
