= Directive 2001/42/EC =

Directive 2001/42/EC is a European Union Directive in the field of environmental protection, evaluating all those plans and programmes which can produce environmental effects. The environmental assessment procedure will be finalised to indicate, to describe and to evaluate all those effects which can happen on the environment when plans and programmes are implemented and as a consequence all the alternative solutions which can be realised on the basis of objectives and the environmental plans and programmes areas.

According to the European Directive, the assessment can be applied to all those plans and programmes edited in the areas of "agriculture, forestry, fisheries, energy, industry, transport, waste management, water management, telecommunications, tourism, town and country planning or land use" and which define the referee scene/panel for authorising the projects listed in the directive 85/337/EC enclosure I and II or for which, considering their effects, it is necessary an evaluation made according to the articles 6 and 7 of Directive 92/43/EEC (Article 3 of Directive 2001/42/EC). Besides, the Directive establishes that it will be necessary an environmental report at the end of the evaluation phases. The European SEA Directive will be generally integrate by the EU member States procedures or it will be merged in specific and established procedures. Each State has to consider that all the evaluations will be done at a different hierarchical level so that it will be possible to avoid doubles.

== Objectives ==
The Directive wants "to provide for a high level of protection of the environment" and, at the same time, it wants to integrate environmental observations with the elaboration and adoption of plans and programmes in order to promote a sustainable development. In this way it shall be possible to evaluate, according to the Directive, plans and programmes with significant effects on the environment.

== Definitions ==
The Directive provides the definitions of some terms:

- plans and programmes refers to plans and programmes (even those one co-financed by the European Commission) made, modified, elaborated and/or adopted by national, regional or local council. It generally refers even to plans and programmes done by an authority in order to be approved "through a legislative procedure by Parliament or Government and which are required by legislative, regulatory or administrative provisions";
- environmental assessment refers to the environmental report editing, to the consultations development, to the environmental report evaluation and to the results consultation assessment according to the decision-making process and "the provision of information on the decision in accordance with Articles 4 to 9";
- environmental report refers to all the plans and programmes documents which contain all the Article 5 and Annex I information;
- the public refers to one or more "natural or legal persons", according to the national set of rules and "their associations, organizations or groups".

== Scope ==
All the plans and programmes with relevant environmental effects need an environmental evaluation. Generally, it is necessary an environmental evaluation for:

- all those plans and programmes concerning "agriculture, forestry, fisheries, energy, industry, transport, waste management, water management, telecommunications, tourism, town and country planning or land use and which set the framework for future development consent of projects listed in Annex I and II to Directive 85/337/EEC";
- all those plans and programmes with effects on sites (in this case it will be necessary an assessment according to the articles 6 and 7 of the European Directive 92/43/CEE).

All those plans and programmes, different from the listed ones, will be classified by the Member States according to their level of significant environmental effects and, as a result, it will be possible to determine whether they need an environmental evaluation or not. All the conclusions adopted by the Member States will be public. The following plans and programmes are excluded by the Directive:

- plans and programmes of national defence or civil emergency;
- financial or budget plans and programmes;
- "plans and programmes co-financed under the current respective programming period for Council Regulations (EC) n. 1260/199 and (EC) n. 1257/1999".

== General obligations ==
The environmental assessment shall be realised during the first phases, this means during the preparation of plans and programmes and before their adoption or their submission to the legislative procedure.

== Environmental report ==
An environmental report shall be done at the end of the evaluation phases: it shall identify, describe and evaluate all the significant effects the plans or programmes implementation could have on the environment and all the alternatives according to the objectives and the plans and programmes environmental scope. The environmental report shall give the following information:

- a picture of contents, of the main objectives of plans and programmes and of linked other plans and programmes;
- the relevant aspects of the present environmental situation and its probable evolution without the plan or programme execution;
- the environmental aspects of the areas which could have a significant interest;
- all the existing environmental problems, related to the plan or programme, including all those on areas of particular environmental relevance (all the areas defined according to the European Directives 79/409/EEC and 92/43/EEC);
- the environmental protection objectives, established at an international, community or Member States level and the way these objectives and all the environmental considerations influenced the plans and programmes editing;
- the possible significant effects on the environment, even biodiversity, population, human health, flora and fauna, soil, water, air, climate, material asset, cultural heritage (including architectural and archaeological heritage), landscape and the relationship among all those factors;
- the measures to prevent, reduce and offset the negative effects (of plans and programmes adoption) on the environment;
- a synthesis of the alternative choices reasons and a description of the way the assessment has been done, including the difficulties in collecting the necessary information(i.e. technical lacks or know-how absence);
- the description of the foreseen measures according to the monitoring;
- a synthesis (done in a non technical way) of all the previous information.

== Consultations ==
The draft plan or programme and the environmental report shall be available to the authorities and the public, who shall have the opportunity to express in a rapid way their opinion on the draft proposal and on the environmental report. Member States define the authorities and the portion of public interested by the plan and programme to be discussed.

== Decision-making process ==
During the plan or programme editing and before its adoption or the legislative procedure starting-up, the environmental report and the consultations' opinions are taken into consideration. When a plan or a programme is adopted the State Members shall inform all the consulted authorities, public and Member States.

== Monitoring ==
Member States shall control the relevant environmental effects produced by the plans and programmes execution in order to identify immediately the negative and unexpected effects and to adopt remedial actions.

== Information, reporting and review ==
Member States and the Commission normally exchange information on the Directive 2001/42/EC application.

== Legislative references ==
- European SEA Directive 2001/42/EC;
- European Directive 92/43/EEC;
- European Directive 85/337/EEC;
- European Directive 79/409/EEC.

== See also ==
- Strategic Environmental Assessment
- Environmental Impact Assessment
- Assessment wiki in Italian
- Evaluation
- European Union Directive
