= Market analysis =

Study of the attractiveness and the dynamics of a market

A market analysis studies the attractiveness and the dynamics of a special market within a special industry. It is part of the industry analysis and thus in turn of the global environmental analysis. Through all of these analyses the strengths, weaknesses, opportunities, and threats (SWOT) of a company can be identified. Finally, with the help of a SWOT analysis, adequate business strategies of a company will be defined. The market analysis is also known as a documented investigation of a market that is used to inform a firm's planning activities, particularly around decisions of inventory, purchase, work force expansion/contraction, facility expansion, purchases of capital equipment, promotional activities, and many other aspects of a company.

== Market segmentation ==
Market segmentation is the basis for a differentiated market analysis. Differentiation is important. One main reason is the saturation of consumption, which exists due to the increasing competition in offered products. Consumers ask for more individual products and services and are better informed about the range of products than before. As a consequence, market segmentation is necessary. Segmentation includes a lot of market research, since a lot of market knowledge is required to segment the market. Market research about market structures and processes must be done to define the “relevant market”. The relevant market is an integral part of the whole market, on which the company focuses its activities. To identify and classify the relevant market, a market classification or segmentation has to be done.

== Dimensions of market analysis ==
The goal of a market analysis is to determine the attractiveness of a market, both now and in the future. Organizations evaluate the future attractiveness of a market by gaining an understanding of evolving opportunities and threats as they relate to that organization's own strengths and weaknesses. A market analysis investigates among other things the influence of supply and demand on a market.

Organizations use the findings to guide the investment decisions they make to advance their success. The findings of a market analysis may motivate an organization to change various aspects of its investment strategy. Affected areas may include inventory levels, work force expansion/contraction, facility expansion, purchases of capital equipment, and promotional activities.

== Elements ==
=== Market size ===
The market size is defined through the market volume and the market potential. The market volume exhibits the totality of all realized sales volume of a special market. The volume is therefore dependent on the quantity of consumers and their ordinary demand. Furthermore, the market volume is either measured in quantities or qualities. The quantities can be given in technical terms, like GW for power capacities, or in numbers of items. Qualitative measuring mostly uses the sales turnover as an indicator. That means that the market price and the quantity are taken into account. Besides the market volume, the market potential is of equal importance. It defines the upper limit of the total demand and takes potential clients into consideration. Although the market potential is rather fictitious, it offers good values of orientation. The relation of market volume to market potential provides information about the chances of market growth. The following are examples of information sources for determining market size:

- Government data
- Trade association data
- Financial data from major players
- Customer surveys

The market for a raw material can be a poor proxy for demand for a product made from it. For example, using total sunflower seed sales to estimate the market for sunflower-based chocolate alternatives would include demand for unrelated uses, such as cooking oil and animal feed.

=== Market trends ===
Market trends are the upward or downward movements of a market over a period of time. Estimating the market size is more difficult when starting with something completely new. In this case, you will have to derive the figures from the number of potential customers or customer segments. Market analysis often incorporates sector-level evaluation to understand how different industries perform under varying economic conditions.

Besides information about the target market, one also needs information about one's competitors, customers, products, etc. Lastly, you need to measure marketing effectiveness. A few techniques are:

- Customer analysis
- Choice modelling
- Competitor analysis
- Risk analysis
- Product research
- Advertising the research
- Marketing mix modeling
- Simulated Test Marketing[5]

Changes in the market are important because they are often the source of new opportunities and threats. Moreover, they have the potential to dramatically affect the market size. Analysts commonly use top-down approaches, beginning with broader economic indicators before narrowing their focus to sectors and individual firms, as well as bottom-up approaches that prioritize firm-level fundamentals aggregated at the sector level.

Examples include changes in economic, social, regulatory, legal, and political conditions, as well as changes in available technology, price sensitivity, demand for variety, and the level of emphasis on service and support.

=== Market opportunity ===
A market opportunity product or a service, based on either one technology or several, fulfills the need(s) of a (preferably increasing) market better than the competition and better than substitution-technologies within the given environmental frame (e.g. society, politics, legislation, etc.).

=== Applications ===
The literature defines several areas in which market analysis is important. These include: sales forecasting, market research, and marketing strategy. Not all managers will need to conduct a market analysis. Nevertheless, it would be important for managers that use market analysis data to know how analysts derive their conclusions and what techniques they use to do so.

== See also ==
- Market research
- Marketing strategy

== Sources ==
- George J. Kress, Taryn Webb, and John Snyder, Forecasting and Market Analysis Techniques: A Practical Approach (Westport, CT: Quorum Books, 1994)
