= Global environmental analysis =

Analysis of the global environment of a company

The analysis of the global environment of a company is called global environmental analysis. This analysis is part of a company's analysis-system, which also comprises various other analyses, like the industry analysis, the market analysis and the analyses of companies, clients and competitors. This system can be divided into a macro and micro level. Except for the global environmental analysis, all other analyses can be found on the micro level. Though, the global environmental analysis describes the macro environment of a company. A company is influenced by its environment. Many environmental factors, especially economical or social factors, play a big role in a company's decisions, because the analysis and the monitoring of those factors reveal chances and risks for the company's business. This environmental framework also gives information about location issues. A company is thereby able to determine its location sites. Furthermore, many other strategic decisions are based on this analysis. One may also apply the BBW model. In addition, the factors are analyzed to evaluate external business developments. It is finally the task of the management to adapt the firm to its environment or to influence the environment in an adequate way. The latter is mostly the more difficult option. There are different instruments to analyze the company's environment which are going to be explained afterwards.

== PESTLE analysis ==
One instrument to analyse the company's external environment is the PEST analysis. PEST stands for political, economical, social and technological factors. Two more factors, the legal and environmental factor, are defined within the PESTLE analysis. To explain these environmental factors, it is necessary to say that most of the factors depend on each other and that they change over the years. Consequently, when one factor changes it also affects the others. The equality for every company is the main characteristic of the factors in an environmental analysis. The different environmental factors are covered below.

=== Political and legal factors ===
Political and legal factors are here regarded as a unit. They refer to framework given by politics. They exist as regulatory or legal frameworks, which can be binding for regions, nations or on an international basis. The frameworks deal with economical issues or issues concerning the labour market. Subsidies, for instance, fall in the category of economical issues. According to the degree of support through subsidies, a country can be more or less attractive for a company. With respect to the labour law of a country, it can highly influence location decisions, too. If e.g. the dismissal protection in a country is very good, a firm may tend to choose a country with a more flexible hire-and-fire-system. Furthermore, the stability of a political system is a real important aspect for most firms. A social market economy with rights for co-determination, regulations for patents, the company's investment and environment protection are main characteristics for a political stable system.

=== Economical factors ===
Economical factors deal with national or international economical developments and have a direct influence on supplier and consumer markets. Examples of economical factors that play a big role are: the qqqqq, the rate of inflation, interests, the change rate, employment or the situation of money markets. These economical factors influence demand, competition intensity, cost pressure and the will to invest. For instance, if the gross domestic product of a country is fairly low, the demand is in general lower than in countries with a higher GDP.

=== University factors ===
Social factors deal with social issues regarding the values, ideas, opinions and the culture of market participants. Market participants can be employees, customers or suppliers. Through their contact with the company, they influence it due to their opinions. The company needs to follow the market participant's change of value and adapt its strategies. Nowadays, a change of values concerning environmental protection is on the move.

=== Technological environmental factors ===
Technological environmental factors are meanwhile of a great importance, especially for industrial companies, which underlie a fast technological change. The increasing speed of technological changes, like in microelectronics or robotics indicate risks chances for a company. Particularly producing companies are affected of that fast evolution.

=== Environmental factors ===
At last, environmental factors are becoming more and more important nowadays. They regard natural resources and the basis of human life. Among those, the availability of raw materials and energy is the main topic. As the availability of fossil fuels, like oil or coal, gets worse within the next decades, the dependency on those fuels stays pretty risky. Moreover, to show an ecological responsibility, companies should assess and reduce their ecological damage. Through rare raw materials and increasing pollution, an environmentally friendly management gets spotlighted more and more by the public interest. Consequently, eco-friendly products or technologies can even signify a competitive advantage.

== Methods of the global environmental analysis ==
The segmentation according to the six presented factors of the PESTLE analysis is the starting point of the global environmental analysis. The analysis can be done with the help of a checklist that evaluates every criterion of a segment. In this manner, the status of the global environment shall be defined. In general, every segment needs to be worked on systematically to recognize changes. Then, the factors and its impacts can be interpreted right. After the segmentation, the analysis consists of four further steps:

1. Environmental Scanning
2. Environmental Monitoring
3. Environmental Forecasting
4. Environmental Assessment

=== Environmental scanning ===
The first step is called scanning. Through environmental scanning, every segment is analyzed to find trend indicators. Thus, after having examined the segment, indicators for its development are defined. According to Fahey and Narayanan, scanning reveals ‘actual or imminent change because it explicitly focuses on areas that the organisation may have previously neglected’. Scanning is also used to detect weak signals in the environment, before these have conflated into a recognizable pattern, which might affect the organization's competitive environment.

Scanning can include every material published in the media such as television, newspapers and periodicals. This method of scanning is called media-scanning. Product-scanning includes scanning of products which announce re-emerging consumer behaviour. Looking for global trends on the internet can be defined as online-scanning.

Modes of scanning

Four modes of scanning can be distinguished. Francis Joseph Aguilar (1967) differentiates between undirected viewing, conditioned viewing, informal search and formal search.

- 'Undirected viewing' means reading a variety of publications for no specific purpose with the possible exception of exploration. This mode is the most cost-efficient one but it also offers the most benefits. There are a lot of varied sources and information which means that the potential data are unlimited. Data are imprecise and vague and there are no guidelines which determine where the search should be focused.
- Applying 'conditioned viewing' the viewer pays attention to the particular kinds of data and assesses their significance for the organization. The field of information is more or less clearly identified.
- 'Informal searching' can be defined as actively seeking specific information in a relatively unstructured way.
- The contrast of informal searching is called 'formal searching'. This proactive mode of scanning contains methodologies for obtaining information for specific purposes.

=== Environmental monitoring ===
Environmental scanning is only one component of global environmental analysis. After having identified critical trends and potential events they have to be monitored. The next step in global environmental analysis is called environmental monitoring. It can be defined as 'the process of repetitive observing for defined purposes, of one or more elements or indicators of the environment according to pre-arranged schedules in space and time, and using comparable methodologies for environmental sensing and data collection'. Through environmental monitoring, data about environmental developments are recorded, followed and interpreted. Out of this, historical development changes that are important for the company can be recognized and evaluated. Additionally, the relevance and the reliability of the data sources are tested. Furthermore, it is checked where prognoses are required.

=== Environmental forecasting ===
The direction, intensity and speed of environmental trends are explored through environmental forecasting. Especially the search for possible threats is of importance. A prognosis of trends is necessary to get a picture of the future. This is done by adequate methods, like strategic foresight or scenario analysis. Several other methods of forecasting are the following: guessing, rule of thumb, expert judgement, extrapolation, leading indicators, surveys, time-series models and econometric systems.

- 'Guessing' and related methods totally rely on luck. Consequently, it is not generally a useful method. In addition, it is almost impossible to evaluate the uncertainty of a guess in advance.
- 'Expert judgement' lacks validation being the only component of forecasting. It is hardly to predict which ‘oracle’ is successful.
- 'Extrapolation' is effective when tendencies exist. Forecasts are most effective when changes are predicted in tendencies. Prediction in changes in tendencies is likely to miss concerning extrapolative methods.
- 'Forecasting based on leading indicators' needs a stable relationship between the variables that lead and the variables that are led. If the reasons for the lead are not clear the indicators may give misleading information.
- 'Surveys' of businesses can give information about the future. They rely on planning which needs to be realized. Changes in business implicate changes in planning.
- 'Time-series models' are popular forecasting methods. They describe historical patterns of data and they focus on “measurable uncertainty”.
- 'Econometric systems' of equations are the main tool of economic forecasting. They consist of equations which attempt to “model” the behaviour of economic groups such as consumers, producers, workers, investors etc. moderated by historical experience. There are several advantages of using formal econometric systems: Economists are able 'to consolidate existing empirical and theoretical knowledge..., provide a framework for a progressive research strategy..., help to explain their own failures, as well as provide forecasts and policy advice.'

=== Environmental assessment ===
In the last step of the global environmental analysis, the results of the previous three steps (Scanning, Monitoring, Forecasting) are assessed. The discovered environmental trends are reviewed to estimate the probability of their occurrence. Furthermore, they need to be analyzed to evaluate whether they represent a chance or a risk for the company. The dimension of the chances or risks is also of importance. Moreover, a reaction strategy to the occurring risks or chances needs to be defined. This is done with the help of the Issue-Impact-Matrix, an adequate instrument to evaluate and prioritize trends. The forecasted environmental factors are here classified with respect to their probability of occurrence and their impact on the company. According to their classification, they demonstrate a high, medium or low priority for the company. The factors with a high occurrence probability and a high, significant impact on the company have the highest priority. The higher the priority, the faster need to be reacted to avoid risks and to benefit from chances. The environmental assessment represents the last step of the global environmental analysis.

== See also ==
- Environmental impact assessment
