= Land development =

Landscape alteration

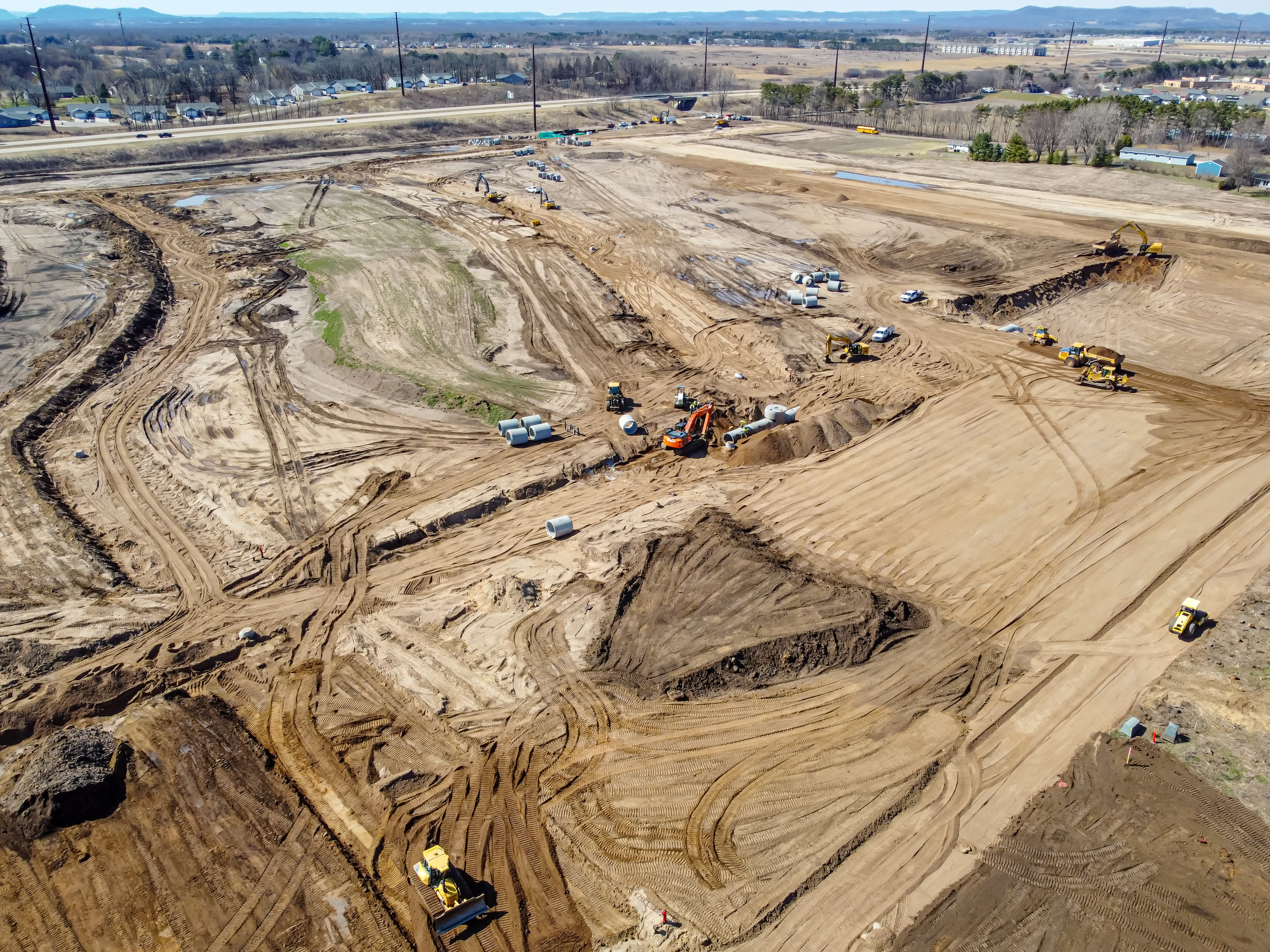
Subdivision land development

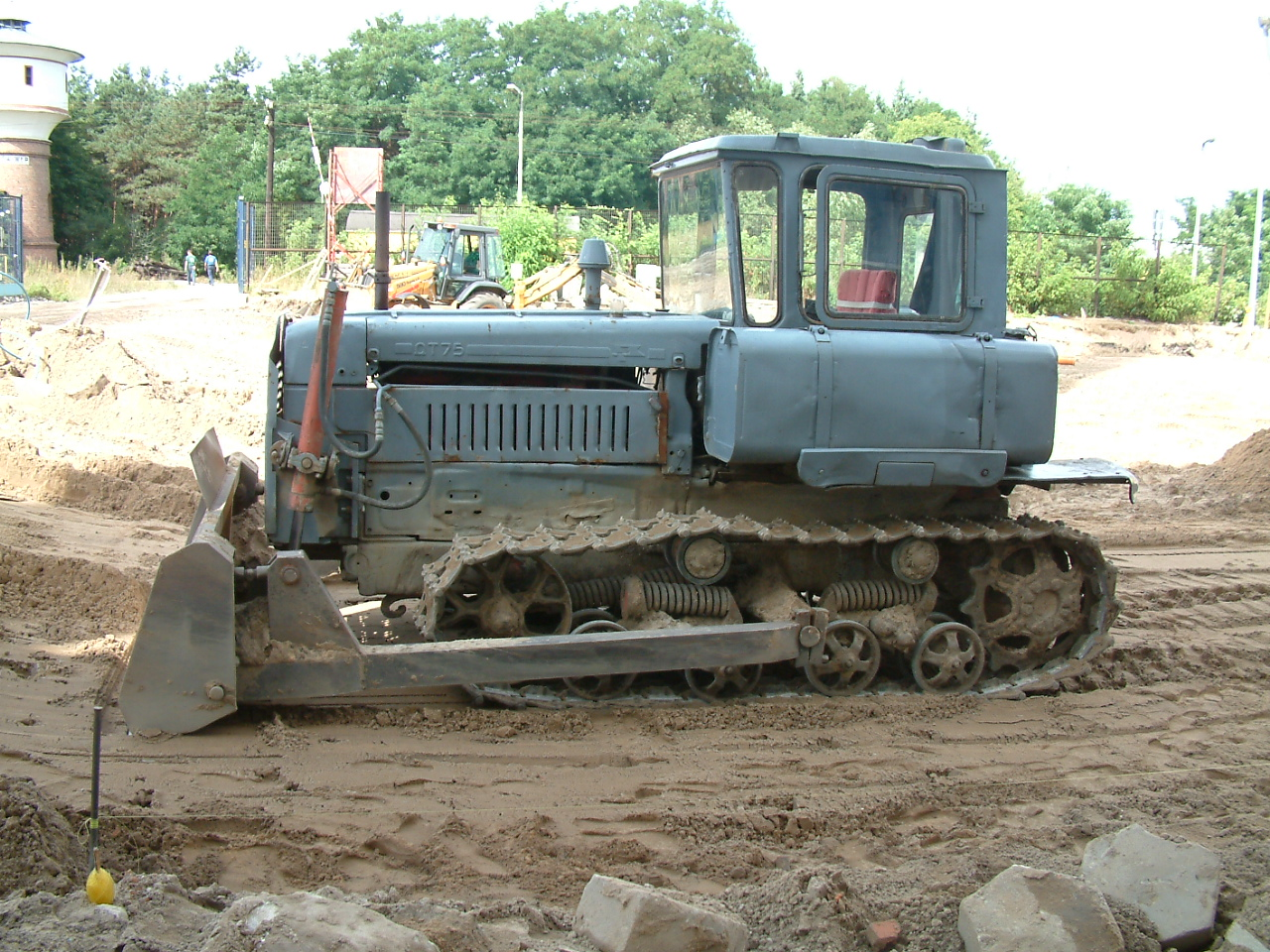
Since their invention, heavy equipment such as bulldozers have been useful for earthmoving in land development.

Land development is the alteration of landscape in any number of ways, such as:

- Changing landforms from a natural or semi-natural state for a purpose such as agriculture or housing
- Subdividing real estate into lots, typically for the purpose of building homes
- Real estate development or changing its purpose, for example by converting an unused factory complex into a condominium

== History ==
Land development has a history dating to Neolithic times around 8,000 BC. From the dawn of civilization, the process of land development has elaborated the progress of improvements on a piece of land based on codes and regulations, particularly housing complexes.

== Economic aspects ==
In an economic context, land development is also sometimes advertised as land improvement or land amelioration. It refers to investment making land more usable by humans. For accounting purposes, it refers to any variety of projects that increase the value of the process. Most are depreciable, but some land improvements are not able to be deprecated because a useful life cannot be determined. Home building and containment are two of the most common and oldest types of development.

Scraper pan pickup and drop off to level the terrain

In an urban context, land development furthermore includes:

- Road construction
  - Access roads, walkways, and parking lots
  - Bridges
- Landscaping
  - Clearing, terracing, or land levelling
  - Land preparation (development) for gardens
- Setup of fences and, to a lesser degree, hedges
- Service connections to municipal services and public utilities
- Drainage, canal systems
- External lighting (street lamps etc.)

A landowner or developer of a project of any size will often want to maximise profits, minimise risk, and control cash flow. This "profitable energy" means identifying and developing the best scheme for the local marketplace, whilst satisfying the local planning process.

Development analysis puts development prospects and the development process itself under the microscope, identifying where enhancements and improvements can be introduced. These improvements aim to align with best design practice, political sensitivities, and the inevitable social requirements of a project, with the overarching objective of increasing land values and profit margins on behalf of the landowner or developer.

Development analysis can add significantly to the value of land and development, and as such is a crucial tool for landowners and developers. It is an essential step in Kevin A. Lynch's 1960 book The Image of the City, and is considered to be essential to realizing the value potential of land. The landowner can share in additional planning gain (significant value uplift) via an awareness of the land's development potential. This is done via a residual development appraisal or residual valuation. The residual appraisal calculates the sale value of the end product (the gross development value or GDV) and hypothetically deducts costs, including planning and construction costs, finance costs and developer's profit. The "residue", or leftover proportion, represents the land value. Therefore, in maximizing the GDV (that which one could build on the land), land value is concurrently enhanced.

Land value is highly sensitive to supply and demand (for the end product), build costs, planning and affordable housing contributions, and so on. Understanding the intricacies of the development system and the effect of "value drivers" can result in massive differences in the landowner's sale value.

== Conversion of landforms ==
Land development places more emphasis on the expected economic development as a result of the process; "land conversion" tries to focus on the general physical and biological aspects of the land use change. "Land improvement" in the economic sense can often lead to land degradation from the ecological perspective. Land development and the change in land value does not usually take into account changes in the ecology of the developed area. While conversion of (rural) land with a vegetation carpet to building land may result in a rise in economic growth and rising land prices, the irreversibility of lost flora and fauna because of habitat destruction, the loss of ecosystem services and resulting decline in environmental value is only considered a priori in environmental full-cost accounting.

=== Conversion to building land ===
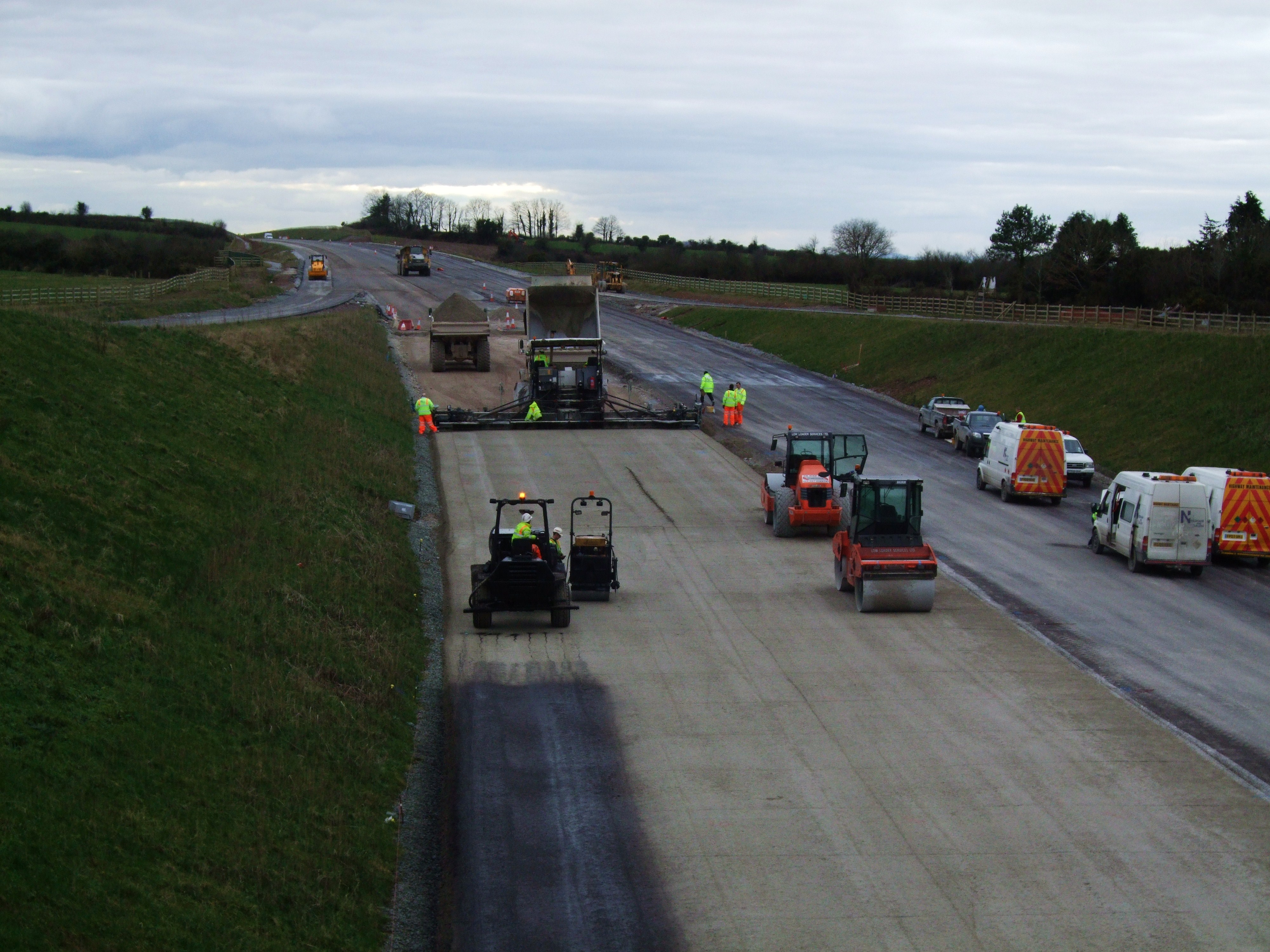
Motorway construction in Ireland

Conversion to building land is as a rule associated with road building, which in itself already brings topsoil abrasion, soil compaction and modification of the soil's chemical composition through soil stabilization, creation of impervious surfaces and, subsequently, (polluted) surface runoff water.

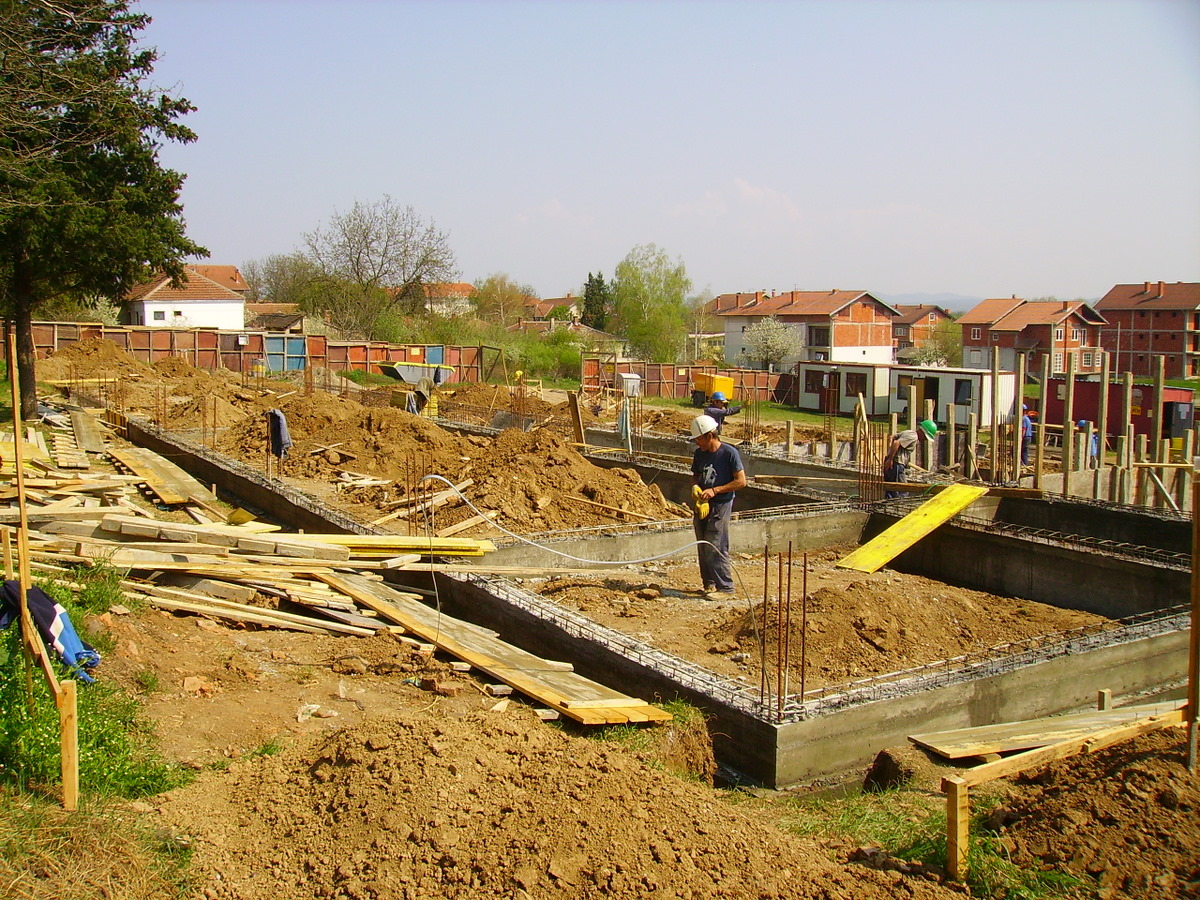
Building construction

Construction activity often effectively seals off a larger part of the soil from rainfall and the nutrient cycle, so that the soil below buildings and roads is effectively "consumed" and made infertile.

With the notable exception of attempts at rooftop gardening and hanging gardens in green buildings (possibly as constituents of green urbanism), vegetative cover of higher plants is lost to concrete and asphalt surfaces, complementary interspersed garden and park areas notwithstanding.

=== Conversion to farmland ===
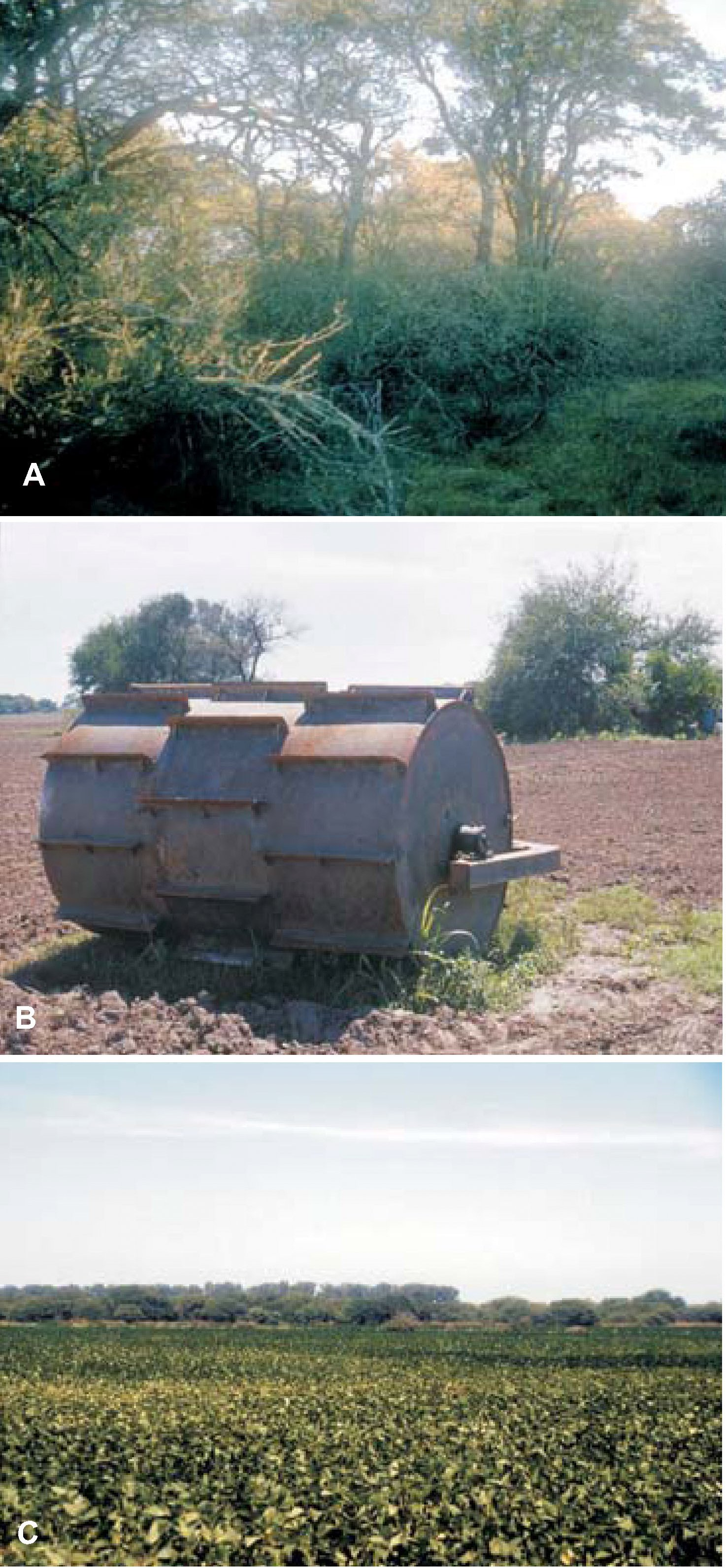
In Argentina and Bolivia, the Chaco thorn forest (A) is being felled at a rate considered among the highest in the world (B), to give way to soybean cultivation (C).

New creation of farmland (or 'agricultural land conversion') will rely on the conversion and development of previous forests, savannas or grassland. Recreation of farmland from wasteland, deserts or previous impervious surfaces is considerably less frequent because of the degraded or missing fertile soil in the latter. Starting from forests, land is made arable by assarting or slash-and-burn. Agricultural development furthermore includes:

- Hydrological measures (land levelling, drainage, irrigation, sometimes landslide and flood control)
- Soil improvement (fertilization, establishment of a productive chemical balance).
- Road construction

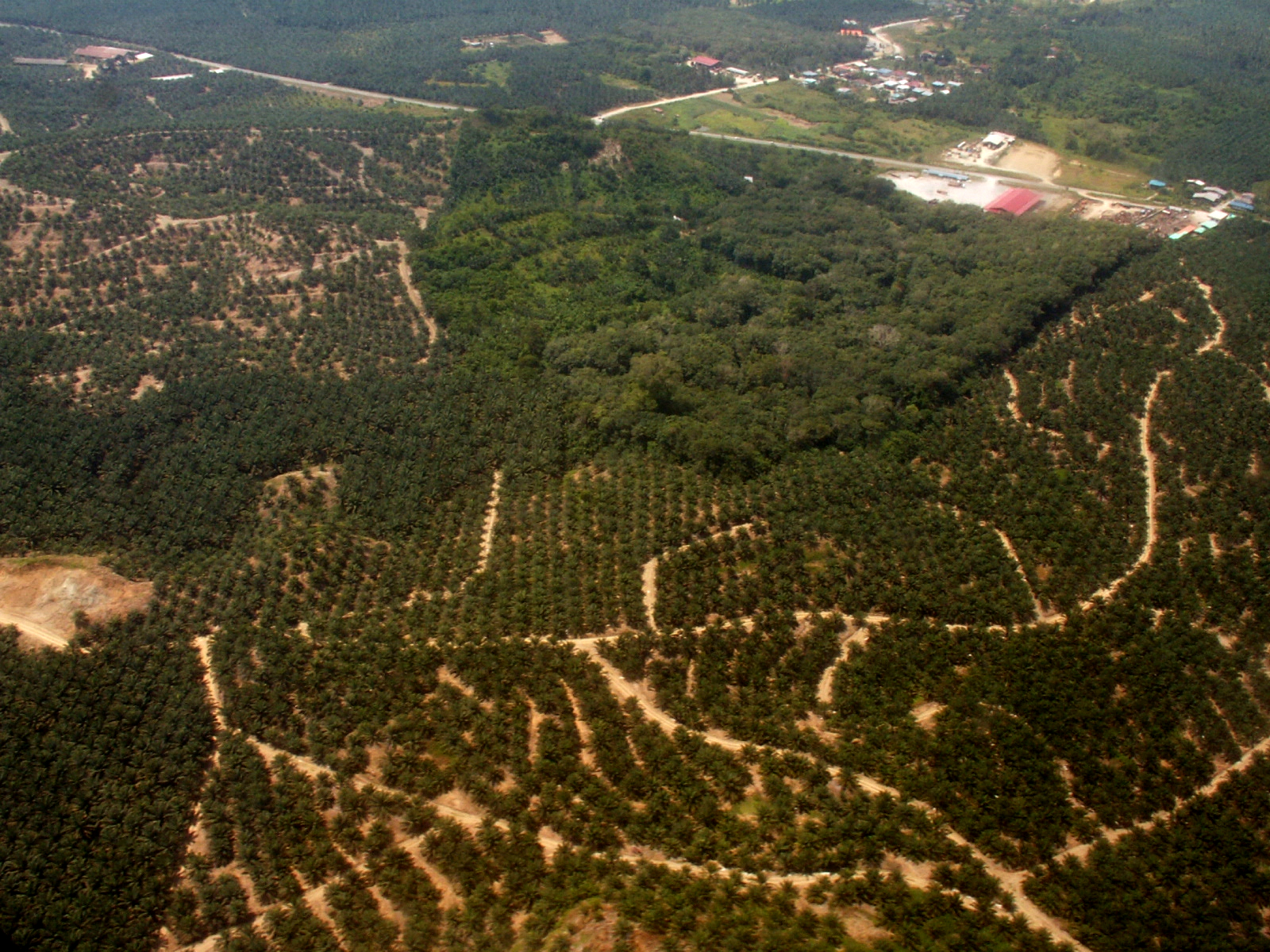
Oil palm plantation and rainforest fragment on Borneo.

Because the newly created farmland is more prone to erosion than soil stabilized by tree roots, such a conversion may mean irreversible crossing of an ecological threshold.

The resulting deforestation is also not easily compensated for by reforestation or afforestation. This is because plantations of other trees as a means for water conservation and protection against wind erosion (shelterbelts), as a rule, lack the biodiversity of the lost forest, especially when realized as monocultures. These deforestation consequences may have lasting effects on the environment, including soil stabilization and erosion control measures that may not be as effective in preserving topsoil as the previous intact vegetation.

=== Restoration ===
Massive land conversion without proper consideration of ecological and geological consequences may lead to disastrous results, such as:

- General soil degradation
  - Catastrophic soil salination and solonchak formation, e.g., in Central Asia, as a consequence of irrigation by saline groundwater
  - Desertification, soil erosion and ecological shifts due to drainage
  - Leaching of saline soils
- Habitat loss for the wildlife.

While deleterious effects can be particularly visible when land is developed for industrial or mining usage, agro-industrial and settlement use can also have a massive and sometimes irreversible impact on the affected ecosystem.

Examples of land restoration/land rehabilitation counted as land development in the strict sense are still rare. However, renaturation, reforestation and stream restoration may all contribute to a healthier environment and quality of life, especially in densely populated regions. The same is true for planned vegetation like parks and gardens, but restoration plays a particular role, because it reverses previous conversions to built and agricultural areas.

=== Environmental issues ===
The environmental impact of land use and development is a substantial consideration for land development projects. On the local level an environmental impact report (EIR) may be necessary. In the United States, federally funded projects typically require preparation of an environmental impact statement (EIS). The concerns of private citizens or political action committees (PACs) can influence the scope, or even cancel, a project based on concerns like the loss of an endangered species’ habitat.

In most cases, the land development project will be allowed to proceed if mitigation requirements are met. Mitigation banking is the most prevalent example, and necessitates that the habitat will have to be replaced at a greater rate than it is removed. This increase in total area helps to establish the new ecosystem, though it will require time to reach maturity.

=== Biodiversity impacts ===
The extent, and type of land use directly affects wildlife habitat and thereby impacts local and global biodiversity. Human alteration of landscapes from natural vegetation (e.g. wilderness) to any other use can result in habitat loss, degradation, and fragmentation, all of which can have devastating effects on biodiversity. Land conversion is the single greatest cause of extinction of terrestrial species. An example of land conversion being a chief cause of the critically endangered status of a carnivore is the reduction in habitat for the African wild dog, Lycaon pictus.

Deforestation is also the reason for loss of a natural habitat, with large numbers of trees being cut down for residential and commercial use. Urban growth has become a problem for forests and agriculture, the expansion of structures prevents natural resources from producing in their environment. To prevent the loss of wildlife the forests must maintain a stable climate and the land must remain unaffected by development. Furthermore, forests can be sustained by different forest management techniques such as reforestation and preservation. Reforestation is a reactive approach designed to replant previously logged trees within the forest boundary in attempts to re-stabilize this ecosystem. Preservation, on the other hand, is a proactive idea that promotes the concept of leaving the forest without using this area for its ecosystem goods and services. Both of these methods to mitigate deforestation are being used throughout the world.

The U.S. Forest Service predicts that urban and developing terrain in the U.S. will expand by 41 percent in 2060. These conditions can cause displacement for the wildlife and limited resources for the environment to maintain a sustainable balance.

== See also ==
- Agricultural expansion – Growth of agricultural land in the 21st century
- Built-up area – Human settlement with high population density and infrastructure of built environment
- Brownfield land – Previously developed land, often contaminated
- Colonization – Establishment and development of settlements by people or animals
  - Manifest destiny – 19th-century expansionist belief in the U.S.
- Developed environments – Places where people live and organize society
- Developmentalism – Economic theory
- Environmental impact statement – Assessment required under US environmental law
- Illegal construction – Type of construction work
- Infrastructure – Facilities and systems serving society
- Land consumption – Expansion of built-up area
- Land development bank – Special kind of development bank in India
- Land grabbing – Large-scale acquisition of land
- Land management – Processes of managing land
- Land reclamation – Creating new land from oceans, seas, riverbeds or lakes
- Land recycling – Reuse of abandoned buildings or sites
- Landscape ecology – Relationships between ecological processes in the environment and particular ecosystems
- Land-use conflict
- Leopold matrix – Environmental impact assessment method
- Mitigation banking – Market-based system to compensate for environmental impacts to wetlands
- Ocean development – Establishing of human activities at sea and use of the ocean
- Political action committee – American political organization
- Real estate development – Process that creates or renovates new or existing spaces
- Subdivision (land) – Divided piece of land
- Subsurface drainage
- Sustainable agriculture – Farming approach
- Urban planning – Technical process of land use and urban design
- Urban renewal – Land redevelopment in cities
- Watertable control – Use of drainage to control the groundwater level in an area
