= Sustainability appraisal =

Aspect of UK planning law

In United Kingdom planning law, a sustainability appraisal is an appraisal of the economic, environmental, and social effects of a plan from the outset of the preparation process to allow decisions to be made that accord with sustainable development.

Since 2001, sustainability appraisals have had to be in conformity with the EU directive on strategic environmental assessment.

Dr. Nick Plant of the University of West England studied and wrote extensively about sustainability appraisals as a solution for information and communications technology challenges facing small non-profit organizations. He concluded that "Sustainability Appraisals promote inclusion and collaboration, and the facilitative approach can lead to empowerment and organizational learning."

The Hydropower Sustainability Assessment Protocol is a sector specific sustainability appraisal method.

== See also ==
- Equality impact assessment
