= Strategic environmental assessment =

Procedure to evaluate environmental impact

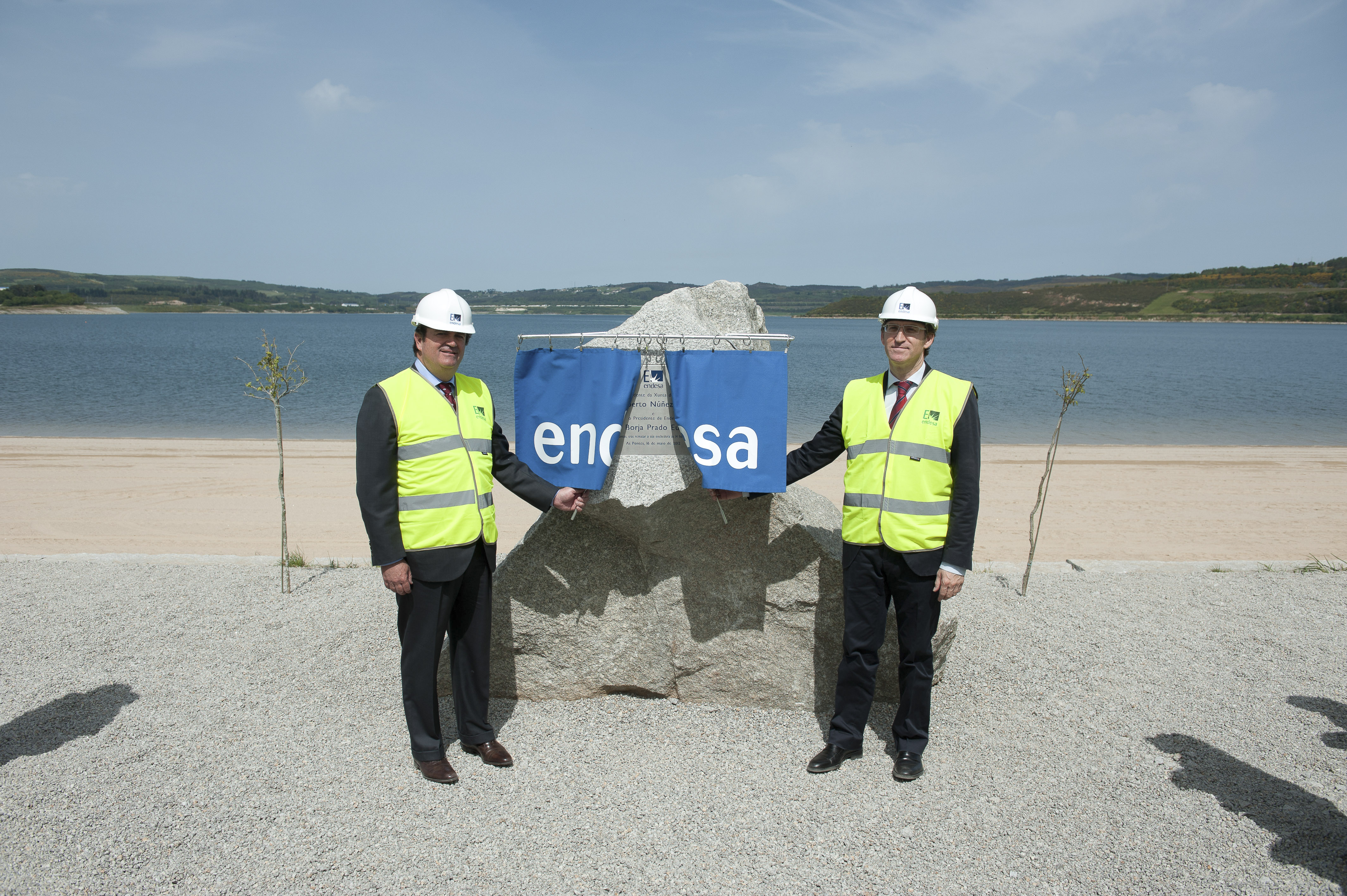

Strategic environmental assessment (SEA) is a systematic decision support process aiming to ensure that environmental and possibly other sustainability aspects are considered effectively in policy, plan, and program making. In this context, following Fischer (2007) SEA may be seen as:

- a structured, rigorous, participative, open and transparent environmental impact assessment (EIA) based process, applied particularly to plans and programs, prepared by public planning authorities and, at times, private bodies,
- a participative, open and transparent, possibly non-EIA-based process, applied more flexibly to policies, prepared by public planning authorities and at times private bodies,
- a flexible non-EIA-based process applied to legislative proposals and other policies, plans, and programs in political/cabinet decision-making.

Effective SEA works within a structured and tiered decision framework, aiming to support more effective and efficient decision-making for sustainable development and improved governance by providing for a substantive focus regarding questions, issues and alternatives to be considered in policy, plan and program (PPP) making.

SEA is an evidence-based instrument aiming to add scientific rigor to PPP making by using suitable assessment methods and techniques. Ahmed and Ernesto, Sánchez-Triana (2008) developed an approach to the design and implementation of public policies that follows a continuous process rather than as a discrete intervention.

== History ==
The European Union Directive on Environmental Impact Assessments (85/337/EEC, also known as the EIA Directive) only applied to certain projects. This was seen as deficient as it only dealt with specific effects at the local level whereas many environmentally damaging decisions had already been made at a more strategic level (for example the fact that new infrastructure may generate an increased demand for travel).

The concept of strategic assessments originated from regional development / land use planning in the developed world. In 1981 the U.S. Housing and Urban Development Department published the Area-wide Impact Assessment Guidebook. In Europe the Convention on Environmental Impact Assessment in a Transboundary Context the so-called Espoo Convention laid the foundations for the introduction of SEA in 1991. In 2003, the Espoo Convention was supplemented by a Protocol on Strategic Environmental Assessment.

The European SEA Directive 2001/42/EC required that all member states of the European Union should have ratified the Directive into their own country's law by 21 July 2004.

Countries of the EU started implementing the land use aspects of SEA first, some took longer to adopt the directive than others, but the implementation of the directive can now be seen as completed. Many EU nations have a longer history of strong Environmental Appraisal including Denmark, the Netherlands, Finland and Sweden. The newer member states to the EU have hurried in implementing the directive.

== Relationship with environmental impact assessment ==
For the most part, an SEA is conducted before a corresponding EIA is undertaken. This means that information on the environmental impact of a plan can cascade down through the tiers of decision making and can be used in an EIA at a later stage. This should reduce the amount of work that needs to be undertaken. A handover procedure is foreseen.

== Aims and structure ==
The SEA Directive only applies to plans and programmes, not policies, although policies within plans are likely to be assessed and SEA can be applied to policies if needed and in the UK certainly, very often is.

The structure of SEA (under the Directive) is based on the following phases:

- "Screening", investigation of whether the plan or programme falls under the SEA legislation,
- "Scoping", defining the boundaries of investigation, assessment and assumptions required,
- "Documentation of the state of the environment", effectively a baseline on which to base judgments,
- "Determination of the likely (non-marginal) environmental impacts", usually in terms of Direction of Change rather than firm figures,
- Informing and consulting the public,
- Influencing "Decision taking" based on the assessment and,
- Monitoring of the effects of plans and programs after their implementation.

The EU directive also includes impacts other than the environmental, such as material assets and archaeological sites. In most Western European states, this has been broadened further to include economic and social aspects of sustainability.

SEA should ensure that plans and programs consider the environmental effects they cause. If those environmental effects are part of the overall decision taking, it is called Strategic Impact Assessment.

== In the European Union ==
SEA is a legally enforced assessment procedure required by Directive 2001/42/EC (known as the SEA Directive). The SEA Directive aims at introducing systematic assessment of the environmental effects of strategic land use related plans and programs. It typically applies to regional and local, development, waste and transport plans, within the European Union. Some plans, such as finance and budget plans or civil defence plans are exempt from the SEA Directive, it also only applies to plans that are required by law, which excludes national government's plans and programs, as their plans are 'voluntary', whereas local and regional governments are usually required to prepare theirs.

=== United Kingdom ===
SEA within the UK is complicated by different Regulations, guidance and practice between England, Scotland, Wales and Northern Ireland. In particular the SEA Legislation in Scotland (and in Northern Ireland, which specifically refers to the Regional Development Strategy) contains an expectation that SEA will apply to strategies as well as plans and programmes. In the UK, SEA is inseparable from the term 'sustainability', and an SEA is expected to be carried out as part of a wider Sustainability Appraisal (SA), which was already a requirement for many types of plan before the SEA directive and includes social, and economic factors in addition to environmental. Essentially an SA is intended to better inform decision makers on the sustainability aspects of the plan and ensure the full impact of the plan on sustainability is understood.

The United Kingdom in its strategy for sustainable development, A Better Quality of Life (May 1999), explained sustainable development in terms of four objectives. These are:

- social progress which recognises the needs of everyone
- effective protection of the environment
- prudent use of natural resources
- maintenance of high and stable levels of economic growth and employment.

These headline objectives are usually used and applied to local situations in order to assess the impact of the plan or program.

== Internationally ==
=== The pan-European region ===
The Protocol on Strategic Environmental Assessment was negotiated by the member States of the UNECE (in this instance Europe, Caucasus and Central Asia). It required ratification by 16 States to come into force, which it did in July 2010. It is now open to all UN Member States. Besides its potentially broader geographical application (global), the Protocol differs from the corresponding European Union Directive in its non-mandatory application to policies and legislation – not just plans and programmes. The Protocol also places a strong emphasis on the consideration of health, and there are other more subtle differences between the two instruments.

=== New Zealand ===
SEA in New Zealand is part of an integrated planning and assessment process and unlike the US is not used in the manner of Environmental impact assessment. The Resource Management Act 1991 has, as a principal objective, the aim of sustainable management. SEA is increasingly being considered for transportation projects.

=== The OECD DAC – SEA in development co-operation ===
Development assistance is increasingly being provided through strategic-level interventions, aimed to make aid more effective. SEA meets the need to ensure environmental considerations are taken into account in this new aid context. Applying SEA to development co-operation provides the environmental evidence to support more informed decision making, and to identify new opportunities by encouraging a systematic and thorough examination of development options.

The OECD Development Assistance Committee (DAC) Task Team on SEA has developed guidance on how to apply SEA to development co-operation. The document explains the benefits of using SEA in development co-operation and sets out key steps for its application, based on recent experiences.

== See also ==
- Environmental impact assessment
- Hydropower Sustainability Assessment Protocol
- Millennium Ecosystem Assessment (MEA)
- Strategic Environmental Assessment (Denmark) (SEA)
- True cost accounting
