= Healthy development measurement tool =

Evaluates impact of urban development

The Healthy Development Measurement Tool (HDMT), developed by the San Francisco Department of Public Health, provides an approach for evaluating land-use planning and urban development with regards to the achievement of human health needs. The HDMT provides a set of baseline data on community health metrics for San Francisco and development targets to assess the extent to which urban development projects and plans can improve community health. The HDMT also provides a range of policy and design strategies that can advance health conditions and resources via the development process.

== Background ==
In the San Francisco Bay Area, between the mid- and late- 1990s, the bustling information economy brought multitudes of young people to the Bay Area and Silicon Valley's technology-inspired new economy. Housing was notoriously difficult to find, with vacancy rates at less than 2%. During this period, average rents increased by 30% and the cost to buy increased dramatically. Although the economic recession triggered by the dot-com bubble brought the city's vacancy rates to pre-boom levels, the Bay Area continued to encounter pressure for new housing development due to extraordinary levels of unmet demand and its high profitability. This phenomenon occurred elsewhere in California and throughout the country, in both urban and suburban settings.

== Land Use and Health ==
Historically, health inequities were associated with differences in health behaviors and health care access and utilization. Today, however, many believe that these inequities result from differences in access to the social, economic, and environmental resources necessary for health. Increasingly, inter-disciplinary research demonstrates that the root causes of disease and illness, as well as strategies to improve health and well-being are dependent on community design, land use, and transportation. Changes in societal conditions can affect many individuals simultaneously, and have broad and diverse impacts on multiple health outcomes.

The value of this tool is that it focuses on broadening the range of social, economic, and environmental resources needed for health on a population level. It does so by recognizing a range of resources needed for optimal health at the societal level and identifying measurable and actionable ways to meet those needs through urban development. It combines quantitative analysis of health indicators with a qualitative assessment of whether plans and projects meet tool development targets.

SFDPH has recognized that it has a legitimate agency interest in integrating health considerations into land use decision-making. While SFDPH does not have formal decision-making authority regarding land use and development decisions, a number of drivers brought SFDPH to understand that it has a potentially important role. Drivers include:

- Community organizations' struggles to limit the negative impacts of development in their communities
- Local experience among SFDPH staff that environmental health outcomes were associated with land use and transportation decisions
- National public health research that "the built environment" was associated with chronic health outcomes
- An international movement to develop tools and methods for HIA's of public policy

The first driver for SFDPH to be involved in land use was that community groups were struggling with the pace of development in their neighborhoods. In addition, they were dissatisfied with the responsiveness of the Planning Department to address neighborhood needs and concerns, including displacement of existing residents and jobs, and an overall lack of infrastructure to support a complete neighborhood. Many groups called for community planning processes and specifically community, social, and economic impact assessments of land use changes to be conducted as part of or complementary to the environmental impact report required by CEQA.

The second driver was that SFDPH increasingly recognized that environmental health and justice issues in San Francisco had roots in land use and transportation planning decisions. For example, SFDPH environmental health inspectors frequently observed that families lived in housing conditions that caused a variety of health outcomes such as asthma and lead poisoning. However, because of the high costs associated with improving these conditions, landlords often would not take action. In addition, the high cost of housing made it difficult or families to leave their homes and find new places to live.

Cumulatively, SFDPH also observed the disproportionate share of unwanted land uses (such as power plants, sewage treatment facilities, substandard public housing, and poor public infrastructure) in places like Bayview/Hunters Point as contributing to significant disparities in life expectancy for residents. Finally, SFDPH also witnessed residential development in historically industrial areas generating noise, traffic emissions, and pedestrian hazards for residents and workers in these areas.

Third, on a national scale, the public health and urban planning communities were increasingly calling attention to the connections between the built environment (that is, land use, transportation systems, and community design) and health, particularly focusing on the contribution of the land use patterns (for example, sprawl) to physical inactivity, pedestrian safety, and air quality. Findings illustrated that urban design and land use regulations could accomplish the complementary goals of preventing illness and ensuring environmental quality. For example, creating higher density, mixed-use developments closer to transit and job centers would enhance public safety, prevent motor-vehicle injuries, increase access to goods and services, encourage walking or bicycling, reduce air pollution, and limit global warming.

Finally, on an international scale, public health practitioners were also developing methods and tools for Health Impact Assessment. The goal of HIA was to bring to light information on how diverse public policy decisions might affect health as well as the social and environmental resources required for good health. While HIA was novel in the United States, it presented a potential way to gain consideration more pro-actively of both root causes of poor health and community needs in the land use development process.

By 2001, SFDPH had already begun using HIA methods to increase the inclusion of health considerations in policy-making. In a study examining the health impacts of increasing the city's living wage, SFDPH found that adoption of an increased living wage would result in decreases in the risk of premature death by 5% for adults 24–44 years of age in households whose current income was around $20,000. For the offspring of these workers, a living wage would result in an increase of a quarter of a year of completed education, a 34% increase in the odds of high school completion, and a 22% decrease in the risk of early childbirth.

SFDPH also conducted exploratory workshops with community members on the health impacts of housing subsidies, farmers' markets, and green schoolyards. In 2002, SFDPH began using HIA more specifically in local land use planning, policy making, and project review. For example, SFDPH conducted HIAs of:

- Carpet policy in public housing;
- Housing displacement at Trinity Plaza; and
- Spear / Folsom condominium towers at Rincon Hill.

== ENCHIA Process ==
In response to development pressures, many communities called on public health officials to evaluate the ensuing health impacts and to advocate for healthy environments. For this reason, the San Francisco Department of Public Health initiated the Eastern Neighborhoods Community Health Impact Assessment (ENCHIA) to analyze how development affects social determinants of health within several San Francisco neighborhoods.

The HDMT was created through collaboration among development stakeholders and public agencies in San Francisco as a result of the ENCHIA. The process was guided by the principles of "health impact assessment" and designed to act on growing scientific understanding that optimal health cannot be achieved by improving health services or individual behavior change alone, but requires advancing healthful neighborhood conditions. Such conditions include:

- Adequate housing
- Access to public transit
- Schools, parks and public spaces
- Safe routes for pedestrians and bicyclists
- Meaningful and productive employment
- Unpolluted air, soil, and water
- Cooperation, trust, and civic participation

Facilitated and staffed by SFDPH, the eighteen-month ENCHIA process was guided by a multi-stakeholder Community Council of over twenty diverse organizations including:

- Community planning and design
- Economic and neighborhood development
- Environmental justice
- Homeless
- Open space
- Housing
- Transportation
- Bicycle
- Food systems
- Child care and childhood development advocates
- Low-wage and union workers
- Non-profit and private developers
- Property-owners
- Architects
- Small businesses

== Components ==
Voluntary, not regulatory approach

This tool is not a new form of environmental regulation or a set of enforceable standards. The tool does not mandate the achievement of specific development targets. Similar to tools such as Leadership in Energy and Environmental Design (LEED), this tool is intended to encourage voluntary efforts to improve health-oriented development.

HDMT provides a systematic assessment approach to simultaneously consider effects of development on six overarching domains:

- Environmental stewardship
- Sustainable and safe transportation
- Social cohesion
- Adequate and healthy housing
- Public infrastructure/access to goods and services
- Healthy economy

These six elements are divided into 27 objectives, which themselves are further divided into 107 measurable indicators. Most indicators are paired with specific, actionable development targets, usually as a benchmark and/or minimum. As of November 1, 2007, fourteen of these indicators are in process.

The San Francisco Planning Department has received and reviewed the HDMT and other ENCHIA products and has committed to using the indicators and development criteria, where possible, in screening the content of its Eastern Neighborhood plans.

This tool comprises a set of metrics to evaluate the extent to which urban development is meeting the needs of human health. Measurable indicators and development targets provide information about both the positive and negative ways in which health is impacted by a proposed development project and focuses attention on ways that development can improve population health. By providing measures and criteria for development, it allows those involved in policy- and decision-making to make more informed choices between trade-offs. As a result, the tool may provide an additional means to support greater transparency in development processes.

== Flowchart ==
This diagram depicts the relationship of many of the tool's components.
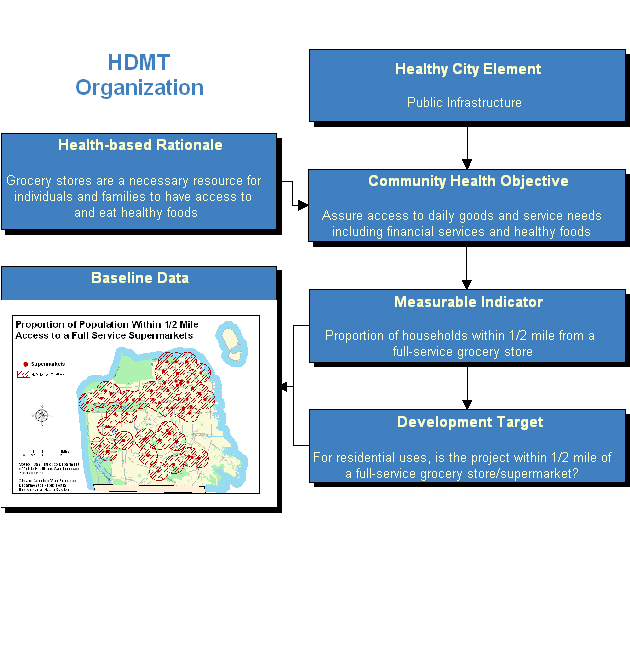

== Examples of Application ==
Thus far, SFDPH has applied the HDMT to evaluate San Francisco's Eastern neighborhoods. Pilot applications for smaller geographical areas are ongoing.

== See also ==
- Built Environment
- Health Impact Assessment
- Environmental Health
- Leopold matrix (environmental impact assessment method)
- Obesity and the environment
- Pedestrian-friendly
- Traffic calming
- Affordable housing
- Gentrification
- Geographic information system
