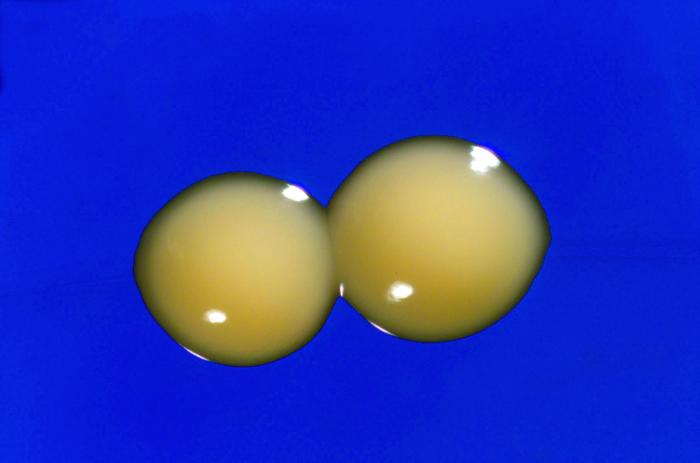

Scientific classification
- Domain: Bacteria
- Kingdom: Bacillati
- Phylum: Actinomycetota
- Class: Actinomycetia
- Order: Mycobacteriales
- Family: Mycobacteriaceae
- Genus: Mycobacterium
- Species: M. cosmeticum

Binomial name
- Mycobacterium cosmeticum Cooksey et al. 2004, ATCC BAA-878

= Mycobacterium cosmeticum =

Species of bacterium

Mycobacterium cosmeticum is a rapidly growing mycobacterium that was first isolated from cosmetic patients and sites performing cosmetic procedures.

Dr. Robert Cooksey and Dr. Jacobus H. de Waard, along with their research teams in the Centre for Disease Control and Preventions’s Mycobacterial lab in the USA and Instituto de Biomedicina in Caracas, Venezuela discovered the M. cosmeticum bacterium, which can thrive in salons, healthcare and clinic settings. This species is the newest identifiable mycobacterial organism to thrive in these settings, joining other rapid growing species, Mycobacterium fortuitum, Mycobacterium chelonae, and Mycobacterium abscessus, that have been found in previous outbreaks. These organisms are very persistent in the environment and can survive unusually harsh environmental conditions. The antibiotic therapy can go on for many months or even years. It very often requires an incision to remove the abscess.

Etymology: cosmeticum, referring to cosmetics.

It is closely related to Mycobacterium frederiksbergense, Mycobacterium hodleri, Mycobacterium diernhoferi, and Mycobacterium neoaurum.

== Description ==
Microscopy

- Cells are acid-fast rods that rarely form cell aggregates in liquid culture. Motility-related structures, spores and cell branching are not present.

Colony characteristics

- Colonies on Middlebrook 7H10 or LJ agar have smooth surfaces and edges, are domed and are scotochromogenic. Colonies from a dilute inoculum on LJ agar are visible after 3 days incubation in an aerobic atmosphere at 28 or 35C, but no growth is observed at 45C.

Physiology

- Growth occurs on MacConkey agar without crystal violet but not on LJ agar containing 5% (w/v) NaCl.
- Tests for niacin production and 3-day arylsulfatase activity are negative, but tests for 14-day arylsulfatase activity, nitrate reduction and iron uptake are positive.
- The type strain isolates were susceptible in vitro to ciprofloxacin, amikacin, tobramycin, cefoxitin, clarithromycin, doxycycline, sulfamethoxazole and imipenem.

Differential characteristics

- Partial sequences of the rpoB (321 bp), 16S rRNA (1506 bp) and hsp65 (441 bp) genes are different from those of all currently recognized Mycobacterium species.
- Characteristics that distinguish this species from other Rapidly growing mycobacterium species include the inability to grow at 45C

or on media containing 5% (w/v) NaCl, the utilization of trehalose or citrate, but not sorbitol, as a sole carbon source.

== Pathogenesis ==
- Possibly pathogenic, first isolated from a culture of a granulomatous subdermal lesion of a female patient in Venezuela who was undergoing mesotherapy with an unknown substance(s) for a cosmetic purpose (weight loss).

== Type strain ==
- First isolated from a granulomatous lesion of a female patient in Venezuela who was undergoing mesotherapy.
- Strain LTA-388 = ATCC BAA-878 = CIP 108170.
