= Rapid growing mycobacterium =

Type of bacterium

Rapid growing mycobacterium consists of organism of the Mycobacterium fortuitum group and Mycobacterium chelonae/Mycobacterium abscessus group and these usually cause subcutaneous abscesses or cellulitis following trauma in immunocompetent patients.

== List of rapidly growing Mycobacteria ==
- Mycobacterium fortuitum
- Mycobacterium chelonae
- Mycobacterium smegmatis
- Mycobacterium abscessus
- Mycobacterium mucogenicum
- Mycobacterium peregrinum

== Nonchromogenic ==
- Mycobacterium abscessus
- Mycobacterium agri
- Mycobacterium alvei
- Mycobacterium arupense
- Mycobacterium fortuitum

== Chromogenic ==
=== Scotochromogenic ===
==== Yellow-Orange ====
- Mycobacterium aichiense

=== Photochromogenic ===
- Mycobacterium novocastrense (sp.nova)

== See also ==
- Skin lesion
