= Mycobacterium hassiacum =

Scientific classification
- Domain: Bacteria
- Kingdom: Bacillati
- Phylum: Actinomycetota
- Class: Actinomycetia
- Order: Mycobacteriales
- Family: Mycobacteriaceae
- Genus: Mycobacterium
- Species: M. hassiacum

Binomial name
- Mycobacterium hassiacum Schröder et al. 1997, DSM 44199

Species of bacterium

Mycobacterium hassiacum is a rapid-growing thermophilic mycobacterium that was isolated in human urine in 1997 by researchers at the German University of Regensburg. It's a species of the phylum Actinomycetota (Gram-positive bacteria with high guanine and cytosine content, one of the dominant phyla of all bacteria), belonging to the genus Mycobacterium.

It is not believed to cause disease in humans.

== Description ==
M. hassiacum is a gram-positive, nonmotile bacteria with partially acid-fast rods. The scotochromogenic colonies are yellow, moist, and slimy when grown at 37 °C. Distinct and drier colonies form when grown at 60 °C.

=== Physiology ===
- Aerobic and thermophilic rapid growth on Löwenstein-Jensen medium at a temperature range between 30 °C and 65 °C.
- Growth also occurs on 5% NaCl and MacConkey agar without methyl violet.
- Susceptible to some antibiotics, including streptomycin, ethambutol, cycloserine, ciprofloxacin and clarithromycin.
- Resistant to isoniazid, rifampicin and prothionamide.

=== Differential characteristics ===
Like many heat tolerant rapid growers, M. hassiacum has an extended helix 10, due to the insertion of an extra cytosine, and a short helix 18. Phylogenetic clustering algorithms place it either with other thermotolerant rapid growers or in a position close to the slowly growing species Mycobacterium xenopi.

However, it is easy to distinguish from other mycobacteria by its growth at 65 °C and inability to utilise any sugar or citrate. Another key identifying feature is its ability to split benzamide. M. hassiacum can also split urea, nicotinamide, and pyrazinamide.

== Pathogenesis ==
Mycobacterium hassiacum was first isolated from human urine in the German province of Hesse, with the host showing no signs of disease. Another isolation of M. hassiacum from urine was also apathogenic. For these reasons, M. hassiacum has been assigned a Biosafety level 1, meaning it is not known to consistently cause disease in healthy adult humans, and is a minimal hazard to laboratory personnel and the environment.

== Type strain ==
Strain 3849 = CCUG 37519 = CIP 105218 = DSM 44199 = JCM 12690. rDNA sequence accession number: U49401.
