= Mycobacterium madagascariense =

Scientific classification
- Domain: Bacteria
- Kingdom: Bacillati
- Phylum: Actinomycetota
- Class: Actinomycetes
- Order: Mycobacteriales
- Family: Mycobacteriaceae
- Genus: Mycobacterium
- Species: M. madagascariense

Binomial name
- Mycobacterium madagascariense Ausina et al. 1992, ATCC 49865

Species of bacterium

Mycobacterium madagascariense
Etymology: madagascariense, relating to Madagascar where it was first isolated.

== Description ==
Polymorphic, gram-positive, nonmotile and acid-fast rods.

Colony characteristics

- Smooth and glistening colonies with yellow or orange pigmentation (1-2mm in diameter).

Physiology

- Rapid growth on Löwenstein-Jensen medium and Middlebrook 7H10 agar at 31 °C. No growth at 37 °C or above.

Differential characteristics

- Differentiated from Mycobacterium aurum and Mycobacterium obuense by its failure to grow at 37 °C

== Pathogenesis ==
- Not known to be pathogenic.
- Biosafety level 1

== Type strain ==
- First isolated from three different sphagnum biotopes in Madagascar.

Strain P2 = ATCC 49865 = CIP 104538 = JCM 13574.
