= Mycobacterium canariasense =

Scientific classification
- Domain: Bacteria
- Kingdom: Bacillati
- Phylum: Actinomycetota
- Class: Actinomycetes
- Order: Mycobacteriales
- Family: Mycobacteriaceae
- Genus: Mycobacterium
- Species: M. canariasense

Binomial name
- Mycobacterium canariasense Jiménez et al. 2004, CCUG 47953

Species of bacterium

Mycobacterium canariasense is a rapidly growing, non-pigmented mycobacterium first isolated from blood samples obtained from 17 patients with febrile syndrome. Etymology: canariasense; referring to the Latin adjective of the Spanish islands where all strains were isolated.

== Description ==
Microscopy

- Weakly acid-fast rods.

Colony characteristics

- Visible growth appears in 2–3 days as smooth, moist, shiny, non-pigmented colonies on Löwenstein-Jensen medium. Growth later develops a more yellowish, smooth, moist and shiny appearance.

Physiology

- Growth occurs at 30 and 37C, but not at 22, 42 or 45C.
- Grows on MacConkey agar without crystal violet, but does not grow in the presence

of 5% NaCl.

- Positive for arylsulfatase activity (3 days) and Tween 80 hydrolysis.
- Produces a low level of heatstable catalase and is negative for reduction of nitrates.

Differential characteristics

- The 16S rRNA and hsp65 gene sequences of M. canariasense are unique.
- Most closely related to Mycobacterium diernhoferi and Mycobacterium mucogenicum.

== Pathogenesis ==
- First isolated from blood samples obtained from 17 patients with febrile syndrome in the Canary Islands.

== Type strain ==
- Strain 502329T =CIP 107998T =CCUG 47953T
