= Mycobacterium diernhoferi =

Scientific classification
- Domain: Bacteria
- Kingdom: Bacillati
- Phylum: Actinomycetota
- Class: Actinomycetia
- Order: Mycobacteriales
- Family: Mycobacteriaceae
- Genus: Mycobacterium
- Species: M. diernhoferi

Binomial name
- Mycobacterium diernhoferi Tsukamura et al. 1983, ATCC 51304

Species of bacterium

Mycobacterium diernhoferi is a species of the phylum Actinomycetota (Gram-positive bacteria with high guanine and cytosine content, one of the dominant phyla of all bacteria), belonging to the genus Mycobacterium.

== Description ==
Gram-positive, nonmotile and acid-fast rods (2-6 μm x 0.5 μm).

Colony characteristics

- White smooth and non-photochromogenic colonies.

Physiology

- Fast growth at 28 °C and 37 °C within 3 days, no growth at 42 °C.
- Resistant to isoniazid, rifampin, Susceptible to ethambutol.

Differential characteristics Belongs to the Mycobacterium parafortuitum complex. Which unifies rapidly growing, scotochromogenic mycobacteria (M. parafortuitum, Mycobacterium aurum, Mycobacterium neoaurum, M. diernhoferi and Mycobacterium austroafricanum).

== Pathogenesis ==
- Not associated with disease. Biosafety level 1.

== Type strain ==
First isolated from soil in a cattle field (Germany). Strain 41001 = ATCC 19340 = CIP 105384 = DSM 43524 = HAMBI 2269 = IFO (now NBRC) 14756 = JCM 6371.
