= Mycobacterium gilvum =

Scientific classification
- Domain: Bacteria
- Kingdom: Bacillati
- Phylum: Actinomycetota
- Class: Actinomycetes
- Order: Mycobacteriales
- Family: Mycobacteriaceae
- Genus: Mycobacterium
- Species: M. gilvum

Binomial name
- Mycobacterium gilvum Stanford and Gunthorpe 1971, ATCC 43909

Species of bacterium

Mycobacterium gilvum is a species of the phylum Actinomycetota (Gram-positive bacteria with high guanine and cytosine content, one of the dominant phyla of all bacteria), belonging to the genus Mycobacterium.

Etymology: gilvum, Latin for pale yellow.

== Description ==
Pleomorphic gram-positive, nonmotile and acid-fast rods.

Colony characteristics

- Pale yellow, Scotochromogenic, and smooth pleomorphic colonies.

Physiology

- Rapid growth on Löwenstein-Jensen medium at 25 °C and 37 °C, but not at 45 °C, within 7 days.
- Resistant to isoniazid, rifampicin, and sodium aminosalicylate.

Differential characteristics

- 5 species-specific antigens, demonstrable in immunodiffusion tests.

== Pathogenesis ==
- Not assumed to be pathogenic.
- Biosafety level 1

== Type strain ==
First isolated from sputum and pleura fluid (London). Strain ATCC 43909 = CCUG 37676 = CIP 106743 = DSM 44503 = JCM 6395 = NCTC 10742.
