= Mycobacterium gadium =

Scientific classification
- Domain: Bacteria
- Kingdom: Bacillati
- Phylum: Actinomycetota
- Class: Actinomycetes
- Order: Mycobacteriales
- Family: Mycobacteriaceae
- Genus: Mycobacterium
- Species: M. gadium

Binomial name
- Mycobacterium gadium Casal and Calero 1974, ATCC 27726

Species of bacterium

Mycobacterium gadium is a species of the phylum Actinomycetota (Gram-positive bacteria with high guanine and cytosine content, one of the dominant phyla of all bacteria), belonging to the genus Mycobacterium.

== Description ==
Short gram-positive, nonmotile and acid-fast rods.

Colony characteristics

- Yellow-orange, scotochromogenic colonies, but the pigmentation deepens with exposure to light. Older cultures are more dry and rough.

Physiology

- Rapid growth on Löwenstein-Jensen medium at 28 °C and 37 °C, but not at 45 °C.

== Pathogenesis ==
- Pathogenicity in humans is not known. Production of a local regressing infection but no death in mice.
- Biosafety level 1

== Type strain ==
First isolated from known tuberculous patient from Cádiz, Spain. Strain ATCC 27726 = CCUG 37515 = CIP 105388 = DSM 44077 = HAMBI 2274 = JCM 12688 = NCTC 10942.
