= Mycobacterium celatum =

Scientific classification
- Domain: Bacteria
- Kingdom: Bacillati
- Phylum: Actinomycetota
- Class: Actinomycetia
- Order: Mycobacteriales
- Family: Mycobacteriaceae
- Genus: Mycobacterium
- Species: M. celatum

Binomial name
- Mycobacterium celatum Butler et al. 1993, ATCC 51131

Species of bacterium

Mycobacterium celatum is a species of the phylum Actinomycetota (Gram-positive bacteria with high guanine and cytosine content, one of the dominant phyla of all bacteria), belonging to the genus Mycobacterium.

Type strain: strain ATCC 51131 = CCUG 39185 = CDC 90-0899 = CIP 106109 = DSM 44243 = JCM 12373.

== Characteristics ==
Mycobacterium celatum is a species of mycobacterium described as a slow growing nonphotochromogenic mycobacterium whose cells are acid-fast, slender and predominantly rod-shaped bacillus. It does not form cords or branches. Colonies are predominantly small, smooth, dome- shaped and unpigmented.

== Health risks ==
Mycobacterium celatum, a slowly growing potentially pathogenic mycobacterium, was first described in humans in 1993. Mycobacterium celatum has been shown to cause fatal disease in both immunocompetent and immunocompromised patients. Clinical symptoms include cough, malaise, and weight loss associated with cavitary lesions and pulmonary infiltrates, whereas the initial laboratory testing includes positive acid-fast stain.
