= Mycobacterium murale =

Scientific classification
- Domain: Bacteria
- Kingdom: Bacillati
- Phylum: Actinomycetota
- Class: Actinomycetes
- Order: Mycobacteriales
- Family: Mycobacteriaceae
- Genus: Mycobacterium
- Species: M. murale

Binomial name
- Mycobacterium murale Vuorio et al. 1999, DSM 44340

Species of bacterium

Mycobacterium murale

== Description ==
Gram-positive, nonmotile and acid-fast rods or coccobacilli (0.4-0.5 μm x 0.6-1.4 μm).

Colony characteristics Smooth and scotochromogenic colonies of saffron yellow color.

Physiology

- Growth on Middlebrook 7H10 agar at 10-37 °C, optimum at 30 °C within 5 days.
- Susceptible to amikacin, azithromycin, ciprofloxacin, clarithromycin and ethambutol.
- Resistant to isoniazid.

Differential characteristics

- Mycobacterium murale and Mycobacterium tokaiense share an identical 5'-16S rDNA sequence
- However the ITS sequence of both species differs.

== Pathogenesis ==
- Not known.

== Type strain ==
- First isolated from water-damaged indoor building material, Finland.

Strain MA112/96 = CCUG 39728 = CIP 105980 = DSM 44340 = HAMBI 2320 = JCM 13392.
