= Mycobacterium brisbanense =

Scientific classification
- Domain: Bacteria
- Kingdom: Bacillati
- Phylum: Actinomycetota
- Class: Actinomycetia
- Order: Mycobacteriales
- Family: Mycobacteriaceae
- Genus: Mycobacterium
- Species: M. brisbanense

Binomial name
- Mycobacterium brisbanense Schinsky et al. 2004, ATCC 49938

Species of bacterium

Mycobacterium brisbanense is a member of the Mycobacterium fortuitum third biovariant complex. They are rapidly growing ubiquitous environmental organisms that normally inhabit soil, dust and water. These organisms frequently are human pathogens that cause a wide spectrum of clinically significant disease. It is important for practitioners to be aware of these organisms as possible etiological agents, as they are resistant to most first-line anti-tuberculous agents.

== Etymology ==
The species name brisbanense means pertaining to Brisbane, Queensland, Australia, the source of the type strain.

== Description ==
Microscopy

- The organisms are acid-fast, Gram-positive, pleomorphic bacilli. Long filamentous forms are often observed, but spores and capsules are absent.

Colony characteristics

- Colonies are mucoid, convex, round, entire-edged and do not demonstrate aerial hyphae.
- Colonies are white to slightly beige and small in diameter (approx. 1 mm) after incubation on heart infusion agar with 5% (v/v) rabbit blood for 2 days at 35 °C.

Physiology

- Growth occurs on Löwenstein–Jensen medium at 35 °C in less than 7 days, but no growth occurs at 42 °C.
- Growth occurs on 5% NaCl and on MacConkey's agar without crystal violet at 28 °C.
- Arylsulfatase activity by 3 days, utilizes acetamide, reduces nitrate, produces urease and exhibits iron uptake.
- It does not utilize citrate or grow in lysozyme. Semi-quantitative catalase activity is weakly positive (<45 mm).
- It does not utilize citrate, grow in lysozyme or produce thermostable catalase.

Differential characteristics

- The nearest phylogenetic neighbour, according to 16S rRNA gene sequence similarity, is Mycobacterium diernhoferi ATCC 19340T.

== Pathogenesis ==
- Reported infections include skin and soft-tissue abscesses with associated osteomyelitis, bacteraemia, endocarditis, keratitis, lymphadenitis, peritonitis, post-surgical infections, pulmonary infections and disseminated disease. Involvement of the central nervous system is rare, but meningitis may develop after trauma or surgery. The immunocompromised patient is at special risk for developing severe diseases, especially catheter-related infection with bacteraemia.

== Type strain ==
- First isolated from an antral sinus in Brisbane, Queensland, Australia
- Strain W6743 = ATCC 49938 = CCUG 47584 = DSM 44680
