= Mycobacterium asiaticum =

Scientific classification
- Domain: Bacteria
- Kingdom: Bacillati
- Phylum: Actinomycetota
- Class: Actinomycetes
- Order: Mycobacteriales
- Family: Mycobacteriaceae
- Genus: Mycobacterium
- Species: M. asiaticum

Binomial name
- Mycobacterium asiaticum Weiszfeiler et al. 1971, ATCC 25276

Species of bacterium

Mycobacterium asiaticum is a slowly growing photochromogenic mycobacterium first isolated from monkeys in 1965. M. asiaticum can, but rarely, causes human pulmonary disease.

== Description ==
Microscopy

- Gram-positive, nonmotile, acid-fast, coccoid rods.

Colony characteristics

- Dysgonic and yellow photochromogenic (pigment not produced in the dark) colonies.

Physiology

- Slow growth on Löwenstein-Jensen medium at 37 °C after 15–21 days.

Differential characteristics

- Unique 16S rRNA sequence.
- Biochemically M. asiaticum (photochromogenic) and Mycobacterium gordonae (scotochromogenic) can only be differentiated by the mode of pigmentation.

== Pathogenesis ==
- Rarely causes human pulmonary disease.

== Type strain ==
- First isolated from monkeys in 1965.
- Strain ATCC 25276 = CCUG 29115 = CIP 106809 = DSM 44297 = JCM 6409.
