= Mycobacterium arosiense =

Scientific classification
- Domain: Bacteria
- Kingdom: Bacillati
- Phylum: Actinomycetota
- Class: Actinomycetia
- Order: Mycobacteriales
- Family: Mycobacteriaceae
- Genus: Mycobacterium
- Species: M. arosiense

Binomial name
- Mycobacterium arosiense Bang et al. 2008

Species of bacterium

Mycobacterium arosiense is a newly described species of Mycobacterium. It is a scotochromogen that derives its name from Arosia, the Latin name for the city of Aarhus (Denmark), where the strain was first isolated.

It can be misidentified as Mycobacterium intracellulare by the commercial mycobacterium assay system, GenoType ® (Hein, Nehren, Germany).

It can cause osteomyelitis and lung disease.
