= Mycobacterium parascrofulaceum =

Scientific classification
- Domain: Bacteria
- Kingdom: Bacillati
- Phylum: Actinomycetota
- Class: Actinomycetia
- Order: Mycobacteriales
- Family: Mycobacteriaceae
- Genus: Mycobacterium
- Species: M. parascrofulaceum

Binomial name
- Mycobacterium parascrofulaceum Turenne et al. 2004

Species of bacterium

Mycobacterium parascrofulaceum is a species of Mycobacterium.
