= Mycobacterium iranicum =

Scientific classification
- Domain: Bacteria
- Kingdom: Bacillati
- Phylum: Actinomycetota
- Class: Actinomycetes
- Order: Mycobacteriales
- Family: Mycobacteriaceae
- Genus: Mycobacterium
- Species: M. iranicum

Binomial name
- Mycobacterium iranicum Shojaei et al. 2013

Type strain
- CCUG 62053, DSM 45541, JCM 17461, M05

Species of bacterium

Mycoobacterium iranicum is a bacterium from the genus Mycobacterium which has been isolated from a patient from Isfahan in Iran. Eight strains have been isolated from patients from various countries.
