= Mycobacterium hodleri =

Scientific classification
- Domain: Bacteria
- Kingdom: Bacillati
- Phylum: Actinomycetota
- Class: Actinomycetia
- Order: Mycobacteriales
- Family: Mycobacteriaceae
- Genus: Mycobacterium
- Species: M. hodleri

Binomial name
- Mycobacterium hodleri Kleespies et al. 1996, DSM 44183

Species of bacterium

Mycobacterium hodleri is a species of the phylum Actinomycetota (Gram-positive bacteria with high guanine and cytosine content, one of the dominant phyla of all bacteria), belonging to the genus Mycobacterium.

== Description ==
Gram-positive, nonmotile and acid-fast rods (1 μm x 1.8-2.3 μm).

Colony characteristics

- Scotochromogenic colonies, production of a saffron yellow pigment on Middlebrook 7H10 agar and a chrome yellow pigment on trypticase soy agar.

Physiology

- Fast growth on Middlebrook 7H10 and on trypticase soy agar at temperatures between 18 °C and 28 °C.
- Capable of cooxidizing fluoranthene with polycyclic aromatic hydrocarbons, including pyrene and anthracene.

== Pathogenesis ==
- Pathogenicity is not known.
- Biosafety level 1

== Type strain ==
- First isolated from a fluoranthene-contaminated site near Jülich, Germany.

Strain EMI2 = CIP 104909 = DSM 44183 = JCM 12141 = LMG 19253
