= Mycobacterium holsaticum =

Scientific classification
- Domain: Bacteria
- Kingdom: Bacillati
- Phylum: Actinomycetota
- Class: Actinomycetes
- Order: Mycobacteriales
- Family: Mycobacteriaceae
- Genus: Mycobacterium
- Species: M. holsaticum

Binomial name
- Mycobacterium holsaticum Richter et al. 2002,

Species of bacterium

Mycobacterium holsaticum is a species of the phylum Actinomycetota (Gram-positive bacteria with high guanine and cytosine content, one of the dominant phyla of all bacteria), belonging to the genus Mycobacterium.

== Type strain ==
Strain 1406 = CCUG 46266 = DSM 44478 = JCM 12374
