= Mycobacterium septicum =

Scientific classification
- Domain: Bacteria
- Kingdom: Bacillati
- Phylum: Actinomycetota
- Class: Actinomycetes
- Order: Mycobacteriales
- Family: Mycobacteriaceae
- Genus: Mycolicibacterium
- Species: M. septicum

Binomial name
- Mycolicibacterium septicum Gupta et al. 2018

Species of bacterium

Mycolicobacterium septicum (formerly, Mycobacterium septicum) is a species of Mycolicibacterium, in the family Mycobacteriaceae. It is a rapid growing nontuberculous mycobacterium in the Mycobacterium fortuitum group.

It has a high G+C content, and stains positive in the gram staining test.
