= Mycobacterium rhodesiae =

Scientific classification
- Domain: Bacteria
- Kingdom: Bacillati
- Phylum: Actinomycetota
- Class: Actinomycetia
- Order: Mycobacteriales
- Family: Mycobacteriaceae
- Genus: Mycobacterium
- Species: M. rhodesiae

Binomial name
- Mycobacterium rhodesiae (ex Tsukamura et al., 1971) Tsukamura, 1981

Synonyms
- Mycolicibacterium rhodesiae (Tsukamura, 1981) Gupta et al., 2018

Species of bacterium

Mycobacterium rhodesiae is a species of Mycobacterium.
