= Mycobacterium phocaicum =

Scientific classification
- Domain: Bacteria
- Kingdom: Bacillati
- Phylum: Actinomycetota
- Class: Actinomycetia
- Order: Mycobacteriales
- Family: Mycobacteriaceae
- Genus: Mycobacterium
- Species: M. phocaicum

Binomial name
- Mycobacterium phocaicum Adékambi et al. 2006

Species of bacterium

Mycobacterium phocaicum is a species of Mycobacterium.
