= Mycobacterium obuense =

Scientific classification
- Domain: Bacteria
- Kingdom: Bacillati
- Phylum: Actinomycetota
- Class: Actinomycetes
- Order: Mycobacteriales
- Family: Mycobacteriaceae
- Genus: Mycobacterium
- Species: M. obuense

Binomial name
- Mycobacterium obuense (ex Tsukamura and Mizuno 1971) Tsukamura and Mizuno 1981

Species of bacterium

Mycobacterium obuense is a species of soil-dwelling scotochromogenic Mycobacterium. The cell wall of M. obuense contains 1-tetradecanol, 2-octadecanol, and 2-eicosanol, and triacylated lipoproteins.

== Use in immunomodulatory therapy ==
Preparations of heat-killed Mycobacterium obuense (such as IMM-101) are immunomodulatory and have been used to direct the immune response in the treatment of cancers—notably pancreatic cancer and melanoma. Recent trials have been directed towards the treatment of colorectal cancer. It has been shown that human myeloid dendritic cells, (antigen-presenting cells that serve as a bridge linking the adaptive and innate immune system), can detect mycobacterial triacylated lipoproteins via TLR2 and TLR1.
