= Mycobacterium bohemicum =

Scientific classification
- Domain: Bacteria
- Kingdom: Bacillati
- Phylum: Actinomycetota
- Class: Actinomycetes
- Order: Mycobacteriales
- Family: Mycobacteriaceae
- Genus: Mycobacterium
- Species: M. bohemicum

Binomial name
- Mycobacterium bohemicum Reischl et al. 1998, CIP 105808

Species of bacterium

Mycobacterium bohemicum is a species of the phylum Actinomycetota (Gram-positive bacteria with high guanine and cytosine content, one of the dominant phyla of all bacteria), belonging to the genus Mycobacterium.

Mycobacterium bohemicum is a nontuberculous bacterium that has been isolated from human tissue, animals, and the environment. M. bohemicum affects soft tissue in animal cells. Mycobacterium bohemicum was identified in 1998 when isolated from sputum that was produced by a 53-year-old patient with Down syndrome and tuberculosis M. bohemicum has been reported and documented in 9 patients worldwide. Reports of the bacterium have been recorded from Finland and Austria. In children, M. bohemicum has induced laterocervical and submandibular lymphadenitis. The excision of the subject's lymph nodes along with antimicrobial therapy increased the health of the subjects in less than 12 months.

The lymph nodes of the subjects were minced and stained according to the Ziehl–Neelsen technique. Within 12–17 days a culture was produced that could be analyzed on a molecular level "Richter". M. bohemicum contains combinations of α-, keto-, metoxy-, and dicarboxy-mycolates that are not commonly found in slow-growing bacteria [3]. Other distinct characteristics of M. bohemicum is identifiable by its unique 16S rDNA nucleotide sequence as well as its variation in the ITS sequence region of 16S-23S.

== Phenotypic Features ==
- Sensitive to compounds such as prothionamide, cycloserine, clarithromycin, gentamicin, amikacin.
- Resistant to compounds such as isoniazid, streptomycin, ethambutol, rifampin, and ciprofloaxin.
- Optimum temperature is around 37 degrees Celsius.
- Enzymatic activity- weak positive test for urease.

== Genotypic Features ==
- To identify M. bohemicum, its resulting sequence was isolated and compared to the international database.
- M. bohemicum has been phenotypically misidentified as M. scrofulaceum, however on the molecular level, the genetic makeup distinguishes the two starins of bacteria.
- Increased cases may surface as a result of improvement microbiological diagnostic analysis.

Type strain: strain CIP 105808 = CIP 105811 = DSM 44277 = JCM 12402
