= Mycolicibacter hiberniae =

Scientific classification
- Domain: Bacteria
- Kingdom: Bacillati
- Phylum: Actinomycetota
- Class: Actinomycetes
- Order: Mycobacteriales
- Family: Mycobacteriaceae
- Genus: Mycolicibacter
- Species: M. hiberniae

Binomial name
- Mycolicibacter hiberniae (Kazda et al. 1993) Gupta et al. 2018

Type strain
- ATCC 49874; ATCC 9874; CIP 104537; DSM 44241; Hi 11; JCM 13571

Synonyms
- Mycobacterium hiberniae Kazda et al. 1993

Species of bacterium

Mycolicibacter hiberniae (formerly Mycobacterium hiberniae) is a species of bacteria in the phylum Actinomycetota.

Etymology Hibernia, Latin for Ireland where it was first isolated.

== Description ==
Polymorphic, beaded, gram-positive, nonmotile and acid-fast rods (0.9 μm × 1.2–1.5 μm).

Colony characteristics

- Smooth and glistening colonies with rose-pink pigmentation but become rough and dry later. Colonies with unique pigment production are 1-1.5 mm in diameter.

Physiology

- Slow growth on Löwenstein-Jensen medium and Middlebrook 7H10 agar at 37 °C (range: 22-37 °C). No growth at 42 °C.
- Resistant to isoniazid, rifampin, and streptomycin
- Sensitive to ethambutol.

Differential characteristics

- M. hiberniae has unusual rose-pink pigmentation, which is unique in the genus Mycobacterium.

== Pathogenesis ==
- Not pathogenic
- Provokes a nonspecific skin hypersensitivity reaction to bovine tuberculin.
- Biosafety level 1

== Type strain ==
- First isolated from true moss, sphagnum, and soil in Ireland
