= Mycobacterium shimoidei =

Scientific classification
- Domain: Bacteria
- Kingdom: Bacillati
- Phylum: Actinomycetota
- Class: Actinomycetia
- Order: Mycobacteriales
- Family: Mycobacteriaceae
- Genus: Mycobacterium
- Species: M. shimoidei

Binomial name
- Mycobacterium shimoidei (ex Tsukamura et al., 1975) Tsukamura, 1982

Species of bacterium

Mycobacterium shimoidei is a slowly growing non-pigmented species of mycobacteria. It is rarely associated with lung disease in humans. It was first isolated in 1975.
