= Mycobacterium seoulense =

Scientific classification
- Domain: Bacteria
- Kingdom: Bacillati
- Phylum: Actinomycetota
- Class: Actinomycetia
- Order: Mycobacteriales
- Family: Mycobacteriaceae
- Genus: Mycobacterium
- Species: M. seoulense

Binomial name
- Mycobacterium seoulense Mun et al. 2007

Species of bacterium

Mycobacterium seoulense is a species of Mycobacterium.

A closely related species with the proposed name of "Mycobacterium paraseoulense" has also been identified.
