= Mycobacterium pulveris =

Scientific classification
- Domain: Bacteria
- Kingdom: Bacillati
- Phylum: Actinomycetota
- Class: Actinomycetia
- Order: Mycobacteriales
- Family: Mycobacteriaceae
- Genus: Mycobacterium
- Species: M. pulveris

Binomial name
- Mycobacterium pulveris Tsukamura et al. 1983

Species of bacterium

Mycobacterium pulveris is a species of Mycobacterium.
