= Mycobacterium poriferae =

Scientific classification
- Domain: Bacteria
- Kingdom: Bacillati
- Phylum: Actinomycetota
- Class: Actinomycetia
- Order: Mycobacteriales
- Family: Mycobacteriaceae
- Genus: Mycobacterium
- Species: M. poriferae

Binomial name
- Mycobacterium poriferae Padgitt and Moshier 1987

Species of bacterium

Mycobacterium poriferae is a species of Mycobacterium.
