= Mycolicibacter algericus =

Scientific classification
- Domain: Bacteria
- Kingdom: Bacillati
- Phylum: Actinomycetota
- Class: Actinomycetes
- Order: Mycobacteriales
- Family: Mycobacteriaceae
- Genus: Mycolicibacter
- Species: M. algericus

Binomial name
- Mycolicibacter algericus (Sahraoui et al. 2011) Gupta et al. 2018

Type strain
- Bejaia; CIP 110121; DSM 45454; TBE 500028/10

Synonyms
- Mycobacterium algericum Sahraoui et al. 2011

Species of bacterium

Mycolicibacter algericus (formerly Mycobacterium algericum) is a species of bacteria from the phylum Actinomycetota that was first isolated from the lung lesion of a goat. It is non-pigmented and grows slowly at 25–42 °C on Löwenstein–Jensen medium. It has also been isolated from freshwater fish, fresh produce, water treatment plant sludge, and a natural cave.
