= Mycobacterium malmoense =

Scientific classification
- Domain: Bacteria
- Kingdom: Bacillati
- Phylum: Actinomycetota
- Class: Actinomycetes
- Order: Mycobacteriales
- Family: Mycobacteriaceae
- Genus: Mycobacterium
- Species: M. malmoense

Binomial name
- Mycobacterium malmoense Schroder and Juhlin 1977, ATCC 29571

Species of bacterium

Mycobacterium malmoense is a Gram-positive bacterium from the genus Mycobacterium.

== Etymology ==
From the city of Malmö, Sweden where the strain used for the description was isolated from patients.

== Description ==
Gram-positive, nonmotile, acid-fast and coccoid to short rods.

- Environmental reservoir: soil and water.

Colony characteristics

- Smooth and nonpigmented colonies, growth below the surface of semisolid agar medium after deep inoculation (as seen with M. bovis), 0.9 - 1.7mm in diameter.

Physiology

- Growth on inspissated egg medium and oleic acid-albumin agar at a temperature range of 22 °C-37 °C requires over 1 week.
- Susceptible to ethambutol, ethionamide, kanamycin and cycloserine.

Differential characteristics

- Antigenic structure: seroagglutination demonstrates a single serovar distinct from that of other species.

== Pathogenesis ==
- Usually infects young children with cervical lymphadenitis or adults with chronic pulmonary disease, (mostly with previously documented pneumoconiosis).
- Rarely causes extrapulmonary diseases and disseminated infections
- Biosafety level 2
- The first case of infectious endocarditis by M. malmoense was reported in 2020 in Cali, Colombia. The patient was a 61-year old woman with a history of biological mitral valve replacement due to rheumatic disease, dermatomyositis and rheumatoid arthritis in management with methotrexate, chloroquine, and prednisolone.

== Type strain ==
- First isolated from sputum and biopsy specimens with pulmonary disease in Malmö, Sweden.

Strain ATCC 29571 = CCUG 37761 = CIP 105775 = DSM 44163 = JCM 13391 = NCTC 11298.
