= Mycolicibacterium aubagnense =

Scientific classification
- Domain: Bacteria
- Kingdom: Bacillati
- Phylum: Actinomycetota
- Class: Actinomycetia
- Order: Mycobacteriales
- Family: Mycobacteriaceae
- Genus: Mycolicibacterium
- Species: M. aubagnense

Binomial name
- Mycolicibacterium aubagnense (Adékambi et al. 2006) Gupta et al. 2018

Type strain
- U8; CCUG 50186; CIP 108543

Synonyms
- Mycobacterium aubagnense Adékambi et al. 2006

Species of bacterium

Mycolicibacterium aubagnense is a species of the phylum Actinomycetota (Gram-positive bacteria with high guanine and cytosine content, one of the dominant phyla of all bacteria), belonging to the genus Mycolicibacterium.

== Etymology ==
N.L. neut. adj. aubagnense, pertaining to Aubagne, the city from where the first patient originated.
