= Mycolicibacter icosiumassiliensis =

Scientific classification
- Domain: Bacteria
- Kingdom: Bacillati
- Phylum: Actinomycetota
- Class: Actinomycetia
- Order: Mycobacteriales
- Family: Mycobacteriaceae
- Genus: Mycolicibacter
- Species: M. icosiumassiliensis

Binomial name
- Mycolicibacter icosiumassiliensis Gupta et al. 2018

Type strain
- 8WA6; CSUR P1561; DSM 100711

Synonyms
- "Mycobacterium icosiumassiliensis" [sic] Djouadi et al. 2016

Species of bacterium

"Mycolicibacter icosiumassiliensis" (formerly "Mycobacterium icosiumassiliensis") is a species of bacteria from the phylum Actinomycetota.
