= Mycolicibacter terrae =

Scientific classification
- Domain: Bacteria
- Kingdom: Bacillati
- Phylum: Actinomycetota
- Class: Actinomycetes
- Order: Mycobacteriales
- Family: Mycobacteriaceae
- Genus: Mycolicibacter
- Species: M. terrae

Binomial name
- Mycolicibacter terrae (Wayne 1966) Gupta et al. 2018

Type strain
- ATCC 15755; CCUG 27847; CIP 104321; DSM 43227; JCM 12143; LMG 10394

Synonyms
- Mycobacterium terrae Wayne 1966 (Approved Lists 1980)

Species of bacterium

Mycolicibacter terrae (formerly Mycobacterium terrae) is a slow-growing species of mycobacteria. It is an ungrouped member of the third Runyon (nonchromatogenic mycobacteria). It is known to cause serious skin infections, which are "relatively resistant to antibiotic therapy".

== Discovery ==
Richmond and Cummings were the first to isolate Mycobacterium terrae, which they described as "an acid‐fast saprophyte". It is sometimes called the "radish bacillus", because it was isolated from radish water.

== Pathology ==
This bacterium was originally injected into guinea pigs, and did not cause apparent illness, leading to the misconception that this strain was nonpathogenic. In reality, however, infection by this organism can cause disease of the joints, tendons, lungs, gastrointestinal tract, and genitourinary tract. In humans, symptoms of infection include swelling, lesions, and inflammation, and may mimic the symptoms of osteoarthritis.

== Uses ==
This bacterium is used to study the effectiveness of disinfection processes for reusable medical instruments.

Mycobacterium terrae is used during validations of reprocessing procedures of surgical instruments, more specifically as a test organism in determining disinfection efficiency. In order to establish a microbial count the extraction media is filtered and the filters are then placed onto agar plates for an incubation of up to 21 days at 37°± 2 °C. At the end of the incubation period the number of colony forming units is counted. This count is used to calculate the log reduction to determine disinfection efficiency. The Association for the Advancement of Medical Instrumentation (AAMI) Technical Information Report TIR30 lists acceptance criteria for this test.
