= Mycolicibacter kumamotonensis =

Scientific classification
- Domain: Bacteria
- Kingdom: Bacillati
- Phylum: Actinomycetota
- Class: Actinomycetes
- Order: Mycobacteriales
- Family: Mycobacteriaceae
- Genus: Mycolicibacter
- Species: M. kumamotonensis

Binomial name
- Mycolicibacter kumamotonensis (Masaki et al. 2007) Gupta et al. 2018

Type strain
- CCUG 51961; CST 7247; CST7274; DSM 45093; GTC 2729; JCM 13453

Synonyms
- Mycobacterium kumamotonense Masaki et al. 2007

Species of bacterium

Mycolicibacter kumamotonensis (formerly Mycobacterium kumamotonense) is a species of bacteria.
Etymology: kumamotonensis, pertaining to Kumamoto Prefecture in Japan, where the type strain was isolated.

== Description ==
- Slowly growing, nonchromogenic.

== Type strain ==
- First isolated in Kumamoto Prefecture, Japan from a clinical specimen.
