= Mycobacterium frederiksbergense =

Scientific classification
- Domain: Bacteria
- Kingdom: Bacillati
- Phylum: Actinomycetota
- Class: Actinomycetes
- Order: Mycobacteriales
- Family: Mycobacteriaceae
- Genus: Mycobacterium
- Species: M. frederiksbergense

Binomial name
- Mycobacterium frederiksbergense Willumsen et al. 2001, DSM 44346

Species of bacterium

Mycobacterium frederiksbergense is a species of the phylum Actinomycetota (Gram-positive bacteria with high guanine and cytosine content, one of the dominant phyla of all bacteria), belonging to the genus Mycobacterium.

Etymology: frederiksbergense, of Frederiksberg, Denmark, referring to the place of isolation.

== Type strain ==
First isolated in Frederiksberg, Denmark. Strain FAn9 = CIP 107205 = DSM 44346 = NRRL B-24126.
