= Mycobacterium colombiense =

Scientific classification
- Domain: Bacteria
- Kingdom: Bacillati
- Phylum: Actinomycetota
- Class: Actinomycetes
- Order: Mycobacteriales
- Family: Mycobacteriaceae
- Genus: Mycobacterium
- Species: M. colombiense

Binomial name
- Mycobacterium colombiense Murcia et al. 2006, CIP 108962

Species of bacterium

Mycobacterium colombiense is a species of the phylum Actinomycetota (Gram-positive bacteria with high guanine and cytosine content, one of the dominant phyla of all bacteria), belonging to the genus Mycobacterium. The species can act opportunistically and infect immunocompromised humans, creating symptoms similar to other respiratory mycobacterial infections.

Etymology: colombiense, pertaining to Colombia, the South American country where the strains were first isolated.

== Type strain ==
10B = CECT 3035 = CIP 108962 = DSM 45105
