= Adenitis =

Inflammation of a gland

- Specialty: Endocrinology

Adenitis is a general term for an inflammation of a gland. Often it is used to refer to lymphadenitis which is the inflammation of a lymph node.

== Classification ==
=== Lymph node adenitis ===
Lymph adenitis or lymph node adenitis is caused by infection in lymph nodes. The infected lymph nodes typically become enlarged, warm and tender. A swelling of lymph nodes due to growth of lymph cells is called lymphadenopathy. Types include:

- Neck
  - Cervical adenitis is an inflammation of a lymph node in the neck.
  - Tuberculous adenitis (scrofula) is a tuberculous infection of the skin of the neck caused by Mycobacterium tuberculosis. Non-tuberculous adenitis can also be caused by Mycobacterium scrofulaceum or Mycobacterium avium.
- Abdomen
  - Mesenteric adenitis is an inflammation of the mesenteric lymph nodes in the abdomen. It can be caused by the bacterium Yersinia enterocolitica. If it occurs in the right lower quadrant, it can be mistaken for acute appendicitis, often preceded by a sore throat. Clinical manifestations may include fever, right lower quadrant abdominal pain, nausea, and vomiting. Most often occurs in children age 5–14.

=== Other ===
Sebaceous adenitis is an inflammation of the sebaceous glands in the skin. These glands normally produce sebum (skin oil, a lipid-rich secretion) which prevents drying of the skin.
