= Mycolicibacillus koreensis =

Scientific classification
- Domain: Bacteria
- Kingdom: Bacillati
- Phylum: Actinomycetota
- Class: Actinomycetia
- Order: Mycobacteriales
- Family: Mycobacteriaceae
- Genus: Mycolicibacillus
- Species: M. koreensis

Binomial name
- Mycolicibacillus koreensis (Kim et al. 2012) Gupta et al. 2018

Type strain
- 01-305; DSM 45576; KCTC 19819

Synonyms
- Mycobacterium koreense Kim et al. 2012

Species of bacterium

Mycolicibacillus koreensis (formerly Mycobacterium koreense) is a slow-growing, non-chromogenic species of Mycolicibacillus originally isolated from the sputum of a human patient. It grows at temperatures from 25 to 37 °C and is susceptible to quinolones. The genome of M. koreensis contains a tRNA array that contains a long non-coding RNA called GOLDD.
