= Mycolicibacter engbaekii =

Scientific classification
- Domain: Bacteria
- Kingdom: Bacillati
- Phylum: Actinomycetota
- Class: Actinomycetes
- Order: Mycobacteriales
- Family: Mycobacteriaceae
- Genus: Mycolicibacter
- Species: M. engbaekii

Binomial name
- Mycolicibacter engbaekii (Tortoli et al. 2013) Gupta et al. 2018

Type strain
- ATCC 27353; DSM 45694

Synonyms
- Mycobacterium engbaekii Tortoli et al. 2013; "Mycobacterium engbaekii" Korsak and Boisvert 1972

Species of bacterium

Mycolicibacter engbaekii (formerly Mycobacterium engbaekii) is a species of bacteria from the phylum Actinomycetota. It is susceptible to amikacin, clarithromycin, ethambutol, linezolid, and rifabutin. It has also been recovered from African tuberculosis patients, water treatment plant sludge, and dairy cattle.
