= Mycolicibacillus trivialis =

Scientific classification
- Domain: Bacteria
- Kingdom: Bacillati
- Phylum: Actinomycetota
- Class: Actinomycetia
- Order: Mycobacteriales
- Family: Mycobacteriaceae
- Genus: Mycolicibacillus
- Species: M. trivialis

Binomial name
- Mycolicibacillus trivialis (Kubica et al. 1970) Gupta et al. 2018

Type strain
- ATCC 23292; CCUG 42431; DSM 44153

Synonyms
- Mycobacterium triviale Kubica et al. 1970 (Approved Lists 1980)

Species of bacterium

Mycolicibacillus trivialis (formerly Mycobacterium triviale) is a species of Mycolicibacillus. It is known to cause relapsing peritonitis.
