= Mycolicibacter minnesotensis =

Scientific classification
- Domain: Bacteria
- Kingdom: Bacillati
- Phylum: Actinomycetota
- Class: Actinomycetia
- Order: Mycobacteriales
- Family: Mycobacteriaceae
- Genus: Mycolicibacter
- Species: M. minnesotensis

Binomial name
- Mycolicibacter minnesotensis (Hannigan et al. 2013) Gupta et al. 2018

Type strain
- DL49; DSM 45633; JCM 17932; NCCB 100399

Synonyms
- Mycobacterium minnesotense Hannigan et al. 2013

Species of bacterium

Mycolicibacter minnesotensis (formerly Mycobacterium minnesotense) is a species of bacteria from the phylum Actinomycetota that was first isolated from a sphagnum peat bog. It is pink-pigmented and grows at 27–34 °C. It has also been isolated from fresh produce and water treatment plant sludge.
