= Mycolicibacter paraterrae =

Scientific classification
- Domain: Bacteria
- Kingdom: Bacillati
- Phylum: Actinomycetota
- Class: Actinomycetes
- Order: Mycobacteriales
- Family: Mycobacteriaceae
- Genus: Mycolicibacter
- Species: M. paraterrae

Binomial name
- Mycolicibacter paraterrae (Lee et al. 2016) Gupta et al. 2018

Type strain
- 05-2522; DSM 45127; KCTC 19556

Synonyms
- "Mycobacterium paraterrae" Lee et al. 2010; Mycobacterium paraterrae Lee et al. 2016

Species of bacterium

Mycolicibacter paraterrae (formerly Mycobacterium paraterrae) is a species of bacteria from the phylum Actinomycetota that was first isolated from the sputum of a patient with an unspecified pulmonary infection. It forms orange colonies when grown in the dark and grows slowly at 25–37 °C. It has also been isolated from
