= Mycolicibacter heraklionensis =

Scientific classification
- Domain: Bacteria
- Kingdom: Bacillati
- Phylum: Actinomycetota
- Class: Actinomycetia
- Order: Mycobacteriales
- Family: Mycobacteriaceae
- Genus: Mycolicibacter
- Species: M. heraklionensis

Binomial name
- Mycolicibacter heraklionensis (Tortoli et al. 2013) Gupta et al. 2018

Type strain
- CECT 7509; DSM 46753; GN-1; LMG 24735; NCTC 13432

Synonyms
- Mycobacterium heraklionense Tortoli et al. 2013

Species of bacterium

Mycolicibacter heraklionensis (formerly Mycobacterium heraklionense) is a species of bacteria from the phylum Actinomycetota. It is susceptible to clarithromycin. It is known to cause tenosynovitis in humans, but has also been isolated from sputum, urine, and a soft-tissue ankle mass.
