= Mycobacterium tokaiense =

Scientific classification
- Domain: Bacteria
- Kingdom: Bacillati
- Phylum: Actinomycetota
- Class: Actinomycetia
- Order: Mycobacteriales
- Family: Mycobacteriaceae
- Genus: Mycobacterium
- Species: M. tokaiense

Binomial name
- Mycobacterium tokaiense (ex Tsukamura 1973) Tsukamura 1981

Species of bacterium

Mycobacterium tokaiense is a species of Mycobacterium.
