= Mycolicibacillus parakoreensis =

Scientific classification
- Domain: Bacteria
- Kingdom: Bacillati
- Phylum: Actinomycetota
- Class: Actinomycetia
- Order: Mycobacteriales
- Family: Mycobacteriaceae
- Genus: Mycolicibacillus
- Species: M. parakoreensis

Binomial name
- Mycolicibacillus parakoreensis (Kim et al. 2013) Gupta et al. 2018

Type strain
- 299; DSM 45575; KCTC 19818

Synonyms
- Mycobacterium parakoreense Kim et al. 2013

Species of bacterium

Mycolicibacillus parakoreensis (formerly Mycobacterium parakoreense) is a slow-growing, non-chromogenic species of Mycolicibacillus originally isolated from the sputum of a human patient. It is susceptible to amikacin, clarithromycin, and rifampin.
