= Mycolicibacter senuensis =

Scientific classification
- Domain: Bacteria
- Kingdom: Bacillati
- Phylum: Actinomycetota
- Class: Actinomycetes
- Order: Mycobacteriales
- Family: Mycobacteriaceae
- Genus: Mycolicibacter
- Species: M. senuensis

Binomial name
- Mycolicibacter senuensis (Mun et al. 2008) Gupta et al. 2018

Type strain
- 05-832; DSM 44999; JCM 16017; KCTC 1914; KCTC 19147

Synonyms
- Mycobacterium senuense Mun et al. 2008

Species of bacterium

Mycolicibacter senuensis (formerly Mycobacterium senuense) is a species of bacteria from the phylum Actinomycetota that was first isolated from the sputum of a patient with an unspecified pulmonary infection. It is non-pigmented and grows slowly at 25–37 °C. It has also been isolated from swine.
