= Mycolicibacter longobardus =

Scientific classification
- Domain: Bacteria
- Kingdom: Bacillati
- Phylum: Actinomycetota
- Class: Actinomycetia
- Order: Mycobacteriales
- Family: Mycobacteriaceae
- Genus: Mycolicibacter
- Species: M. longobardus

Binomial name
- Mycolicibacter longobardus (Tortoli et al. 2013) Gupta et al. 2018

Type strain
- CCUG 58460; DSM 45394; FI-07034

Synonyms
- Mycobacterium longobardum Tortoli et al. 2013

Species of bacterium

Mycolicibacter longobardus (formerly Mycobacterium longobardum) is a species of bacteria from the phylum Actinomycetota. It is susceptible to sulfamethoxazole and clarithromycin. It has been associated with cases of osteomyelitis and an epidermal inclusion cyst of the hand,
