= Mycobacterium szulgai =

Scientific classification
- Domain: Bacteria
- Kingdom: Bacillati
- Phylum: Actinomycetota
- Class: Actinomycetia
- Order: Mycobacteriales
- Family: Mycobacteriaceae
- Genus: Mycobacterium
- Species: M. szulgai

Binomial name
- Mycobacterium szulgai Marks et al. 1972 (Approved Lists 1980)

Species of bacterium

Mycobacterium szulgai is a species of Mycobacterium. It is a scotochromogen and is currently ungrouped. It is known to cause skin infections.
