= Mycolicibacter virginiensis =

Scientific classification
- Domain: Bacteria
- Kingdom: Bacillati
- Phylum: Actinomycetota
- Class: Actinomycetia
- Order: Mycobacteriales
- Family: Mycobacteriaceae
- Genus: Mycolicibacter
- Species: M. virginiensis

Binomial name
- Mycolicibacter virginiensis (Vasireddy et al. 2017) Gupta et al. 2018

Type strain
- CIP 110918; DSM 100883; MO-233

Synonyms
- Mycobacterium virginiense Vasireddy et al. 2017

Species of bacterium

"Mycolicibacter virginiensis" (formerly Mycobacterium virginiense) is a species of bacteria from the phylum Actinomycetota. It is susceptible to clarithromycin, ethambutol, rifabutin, and TMP-SMX. It has been isolated from cases of tenosynovitis, swine farm mud, bovine feces, sputum, and diseased dromedaries.
