= Mycolicibacter sinensis =

Scientific classification
- Domain: Bacteria
- Kingdom: Bacillati
- Phylum: Actinomycetota
- Class: Actinomycetes
- Order: Mycobacteriales
- Family: Mycobacteriaceae
- Genus: Mycolicibacter
- Species: M. sinensis

Binomial name
- Mycolicibacter sinensis Gupta et al. 2018

Type strain
- JDM601

Synonyms
- "Mycobacterium sinense" Zhang et al. 2013

Species of bacterium

"Mycolicibacter sinensis" (formerly "Mycobacterium sinense") is a species of bacteria from the phylum Actinomycetota that was isolated from a human manifesting tuberculosis-like disease. It is susceptible to ethambutol but is resistant to most other anti-tuberculosis drugs. It has also been isolated from domestic and wild animals.
