= Ruth Gordon (disambiguation) =

Ruth Gordon (1896–1985) was an American film, stage, and television actress.

Ruth Gordon may also refer to:

- Ruth E. Gordon (1910–2003), American bacteriologist
- Ruth Gordon, a minor character in the Brookside soap opera
- Ruth Schnapp née Gordon, (1926–2014), American structural engineer
