= Mycolicibacillus =

Scientific classification
- Domain: Bacteria
- Kingdom: Bacillati
- Phylum: Actinomycetota
- Class: Actinomycetes
- Order: Mycobacteriales
- Family: Mycobacteriaceae
- Genus: Mycolicibacillus; Gupta et al. 2018

Type species
- Mycolicibacillus trivialis (Kubica et al. 1970) Gupta et al. 2018

Species
- M. koreensis (Kim et al. 2012) Gupta et al. 2018; M. parakoreensis (Kim et al. 2013) Gupta et al. 2018; M. trivialis (Kubica et al. 1970) Gupta et al. 2018

Genus of Gram-Positive rod-shaped bacteria

Mycolicibacillus is a genus of Gram-Positive rod-shaped bacteria in the family Mycobacteriaceae from the order Mycobacteriales.

Members of Mycolicibacillus were demarcated from the larger genus Mycobacterium in 2018 by Gupta et al. based on evidence from various phylogenetic trees constructed based on conserved genome sequences, comparative genomic analyses and average amino acid identity values. In addition to this genus, the study proposed the division of Mycobacterium into a total of five distinct genera, which was met with some resistance by some of the scientific community. The resistance was based on the grounds that Mycobacterium contains some clinically relevant species and name changes might cause confusion among clinicians and other researchers.

In 2020, Yamada et al. analyzed the fundamental morphological properties of the new genera, including the cell diameter, cell length, cell perimeter, cell circularity and aspect ratio, and determined that there were significant differences between the five genera, thus supporting the new division.

The name Mycolicibacillus is derived from the Latin noun acidum mycolicum (translates to mycolic acid) and the Latin noun bacillus (translates to small staff or rod). Together the name refers to a genus of mycolic acid-containing, rod-shaped bacteria.

== Biochemical characteristics and molecular signatures ==
While majority of the genus are slow growing bacteria species (taking more than seven days to form colonies), some do display intermediate growth rates (taking 5–15 days to form colonies). All species are nonchromogenic. Species are not thought to be pathogenic, although some have been isolated form human patients with pulmonary dysfunction. The genome size for the members of Mycolicibacillus ranges from 3.89–4.08 Mbp and their G+C content is 69.4 mol%. 22 unique conserved signature proteins (CSPs) were identified for this genus.

== Phylogeny ==
The phylogeny of Mycolicibacillus is based on 16S rRNA analysis.

- - Mycolicibacillus
    - - Mycolicibacillus koreensis
      - Mycolicibacillus parakoreensis
    - Mycolicibacillus trivialis
  - Mycolicibacter (outgroup)
