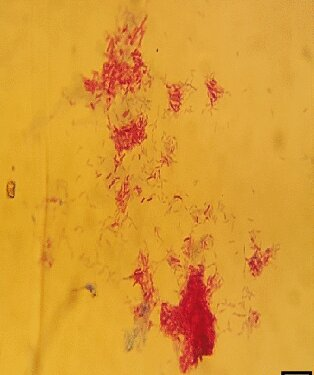

Scientific classification
- Domain: Bacteria
- Kingdom: Bacillati
- Phylum: Actinomycetota
- Class: Actinomycetia
- Order: Mycobacteriales
- Family: Mycobacteriaceae
- Genus: Mycolicibacter
- Species: M. arupensis

Binomial name
- Mycolicibacter arupensis (Cloud et al. 2006) Gupta et al. 2018

Type strain
- AR30097; ATCC BAA-1242; DSM 44942

Synonyms
- Mycobacterium arupense Cloud et al. 2006

= Mycolicibacter arupensis =

Species of bacterium

Mycolicibacter arupensis (formerly Mycobacterium arupense) is a slowly growing mycobacterium first isolated from soil and human sputum samples in Spain. Etymology: arupense, pertaining to the ARUP Institute for Clinical and Experimental Pathology, where the type strain was characterized.

== Description ==
Microscopy

- Gram-positive, nonmotile and acid-fast rods (1–3 μm × 0.5–0.7 μm), mostly strong acid-fast.

Colony characteristics

- Colonies are eugonic, rough and nonpigmented.

Physiology

- Colonies occur within 5 days at 30 °C (optimum temperature, no growth at 45 °C) on Löwenstein-Jensen medium and on Middlebrook 7H10 agar and slowly (10–12 days) at 37 °C; no growth occurs at 42 °C.
- No growth on MacConkey agar without crystal violet.
- The type strain is resistant to D-cycloserine, streptomycin, isoniazid (0.1 and 1 mg/L), rifampin, and thiacetazone and is susceptible to isoniazid (10 mg/L), kanamycin, and capreomycin.

== Pathogenesis ==
There are emerging reports of human pathogenesis caused by M. arupensis. Pulmonary infection and tenosynovitis have been documented. A recent case of recurrent soft tissue abscess caused by M. arupensis has been identified.
