= Mycolicibacterium aichiense =

Scientific classification
- Domain: Bacteria
- Kingdom: Bacillati
- Phylum: Actinomycetota
- Class: Actinomycetia
- Order: Mycobacteriales
- Family: Mycobacteriaceae
- Genus: Mycolicibacterium
- Species: M. aichiense

Binomial name
- Mycolicibacterium aichiense (Tsukamura 1981) Gupta et al. 2018

Type strain
- 49 005; 5545; ATCC 27280; CIP 106808; DSM 44147; JCM 6376; LMG 19259; NCTC 10820

Synonyms
- "Mycobacterium aichiense" Tsukamura 1973; Mycobacterium aichiense (ex Tsukamura 1973) Tsukamura 1981

Species of bacterium

Mycolicibacterium aichiense (formerly Mycobacterium aichiense) is a species of bacteria from the phylum Actinomycetota that was first isolated from soil and from human sputum. It produces pigments when grow in the dark and grows rapidly at 25–37 °C on Ogawa egg medium or Sauton agar medium.
