= Mycolicibacterium alvei =

Scientific classification
- Domain: Bacteria
- Kingdom: Bacillati
- Phylum: Actinomycetota
- Class: Actinomycetes
- Order: Mycobacteriales
- Family: Mycobacteriaceae
- Genus: Mycolicibacterium
- Species: M. alvei

Binomial name
- Mycolicibacterium alvei (Ausina et al. 1992) Gupta et al. 2018

Type strain
- CR-21; ATCC 51304; CIP 103464; DSM 44176; JCM 12272

Synonyms
- Mycobacterium alvei Ausina et al. 1992

Species of bacterium

Mycolicibacterium alvei is a species of the phylum Actinomycetota (Gram-positive bacteria with high guanine and cytosine content, one of the dominant phyla of all bacteria), belonging to the genus Mycolicibacterium.

== Description ==
Gram-positive, nonmotile and acid-fast rods (1–3 μm × 0.5–0.7 μm).

Colony characteristics

- Colonies are eugonic, rough and nonpigmented.

Physiology

- Colonies occur within 5 days at 30 °C (optimum temperature, no growth at 45 °C) on Löwenstein–Jensen medium and on Middlebrook 7H10 agar.
- The type strain is resistant to D-cycloserine, streptomycin, isoniazid, rifampin, and thiacetazone
- The type strain is susceptible to kanamycin, capreomycin and high levels of isoniazid.

Differential characteristics

- Differentiation from all other mycobacterial species by its unusual mycolate pattern.

== Pathogenesis ==
- Not associated with disease.
- Biosafety level 1

== Type strain ==
First isolated from water samples, from soil and human sputum samples in Spain.
