= Mycobacterium xenopi =

Scientific classification
- Domain: Bacteria
- Kingdom: Bacillati
- Phylum: Actinomycetota
- Class: Actinomycetes
- Order: Mycobacteriales
- Family: Mycobacteriaceae
- Genus: Mycobacterium
- Species: M. xenopi

Binomial name
- Mycobacterium xenopi Schwabacher 1959, ATCC 19250

Species of bacterium

Mycobacterium xenopi is a slow-growing scotochromogenic species of Mycobacterium. It was first reported by Schwabacher in 1959, having been isolated in lesions found on a Xenopus laevis, but the possibility of human infection was not confirmed until 1965. It has been cultured from hot and cold water taps, hospital hot water generators and storage tanks, and other environmental sources.

It has low pathogenicity in humans, and where infections have been found they are closely associated with immunocompromised individuals, such as an extrapulmonary malignancy, alcoholism, diabetes mellitus, or immunosuppressive therapy. Pulmonary disease may be chronic, subacute, or acute; symptoms are indistinguishable from those associated with disease caused by M. kansasii.

Radiographic findings with M. xenopi pulmonary disease are variable but most often include upper lobe cavitary abnormalities similar to tuberculosis.

Treatment is usually with macrolide, rifampin, and ethambutol with moxifloxacin.

Type strain: strain ATCC 19250 = CCUG 28011 = CCUG 31306 = CIP 104035 = DSM 43995 = NCTC 10042.
