= Mycobacterium mucogenicum =

Scientific classification
- Domain: Bacteria
- Kingdom: Bacillati
- Phylum: Actinomycetota
- Class: Actinomycetia
- Order: Mycobacteriales
- Family: Mycobacteriaceae
- Genus: Mycobacterium
- Species: M. mucogenicum

Binomial name
- Mycobacterium mucogenicum Springer et al. 1995, ATCC 49650

Species of bacterium

Mycobacterium mucogenicum
Etymology: mucogenicum, from the organism's highly mucoid appearance.

== Description ==
Gram-positive, nonmotile, curved and acid-fast rods.

Colony characteristics

- Highly mucoid behavior of most strains on solid agar. Smooth and off-white on Middlebrook 7H10 agar

Physiology

- Rapid growth on Middlebrook 7H10 at 28 °C to 37 °C, but not at 42 °C, within 2 – 4 days.
- Susceptible to amikacin, imipenem, cefoxitin, clarithromycin and ciprofloxacin.
- Resistant to isoniazid and rifampin.

== Pathogenesis ==
- Posttraumatic skin infections,
- catheter sepsis and respiratory isolates without clinical significance except in immunocompromised hosts.
- Biosafety level 2

== Type strain ==
- First isolated in 1976 during an outbreak of peritonitis associated with automated peritoneal dialysis machines in the north-western United States. In 2019, a complete genome sequence of M. mucogenicum DSM 44124 (isolated from the cause of peritonitis) was sequenced by using the PacBio Sequencing Technology and with the median coverage 101x resulted in to a final genome assembly of size 6,099,273 base pairs is available at the NCBI database with an accession id POTL00000000.
- Strain ATCC 49650 = CCUG 47451 = CIP 105223 = DSM 44625 = JCM 13575.
