= Mycolicibacter nonchromogenicus =

Scientific classification
- Domain: Bacteria
- Kingdom: Bacillati
- Phylum: Actinomycetota
- Class: Actinomycetia
- Order: Mycobacteriales
- Family: Mycobacteriaceae
- Genus: Mycolicibacter
- Species: M. nonchromogenicus

Binomial name
- Mycolicibacter nonchromogenicus (Tsukamura 1965) Gupta et al. 2018

Type strain
- ATCC 19530; CCUG 28009; CIP 106811; DSM 44164; JCM 6364; NCTC 10424

Synonyms
- Mycobacterium nonchromogenicum Tsukamura 1965 (Approved Lists 1980)

Species of bacterium

Mycolicibacter nonchromogenicus (formerly Mycobacterium nonchromogenicum) is an infectious species of bacteria.
