= Mycolicibacterium austroafricanum =

Scientific classification
- Domain: Bacteria
- Kingdom: Bacillati
- Phylum: Actinomycetota
- Class: Actinomycetes
- Order: Mycobacteriales
- Family: Mycobacteriaceae
- Genus: Mycolicibacterium
- Species: M. austroafricanum

Binomial name
- Mycolicibacterium austroafricanum (Tsukamura et al. 1983) Gupta et al. 2018

Type strain
- E9789-SA12441; ATCC 33464; CCUG 37667; CIP 105395; DSM 44191; HAMBI 2271; JCM 6369

Synonyms
- Mycobacterium austroafricanum Tsukamura et al. 1983

Species of bacterium

Mycolicibacterium austroafricanum is a species of the phylum Actinomycetota (Gram-positive bacteria with high guanine and cytosine content, one of the dominant phyla of all bacteria), belonging to the genus Mycolicibacterium.
