= IMM-101 =

Experimental medication

Clinical data
- Other names: Mycobacterium obuense (heat-killed)

Identifiers
- UNII: IZT740JY57

IMM-101 is an immunomodulatory drug that is being studied to see if it is useful in chemotherapy. It consists of heat-killed Mycobacterium obuense bacteria. It may have relatively few side effects compared to other drugs.
