= Mycobacterium neoaurum =

Scientific classification
- Domain: Bacteria
- Kingdom: Bacillati
- Phylum: Actinomycetota
- Class: Actinomycetia
- Order: Mycobacteriales
- Family: Mycobacteriaceae
- Genus: Mycobacterium
- Species: M. neoaurum

Binomial name
- Mycobacterium neoaurum Tsukamura 1972 (Approved Lists 1980)

Species of bacterium

Mycobacterium neoaurum is a rapid growing Mycobacterium, it can found in soil and as well as known to be isolated from patient isolates.
