= Mycobacteria growth indicator tube =

Bacteriology medium

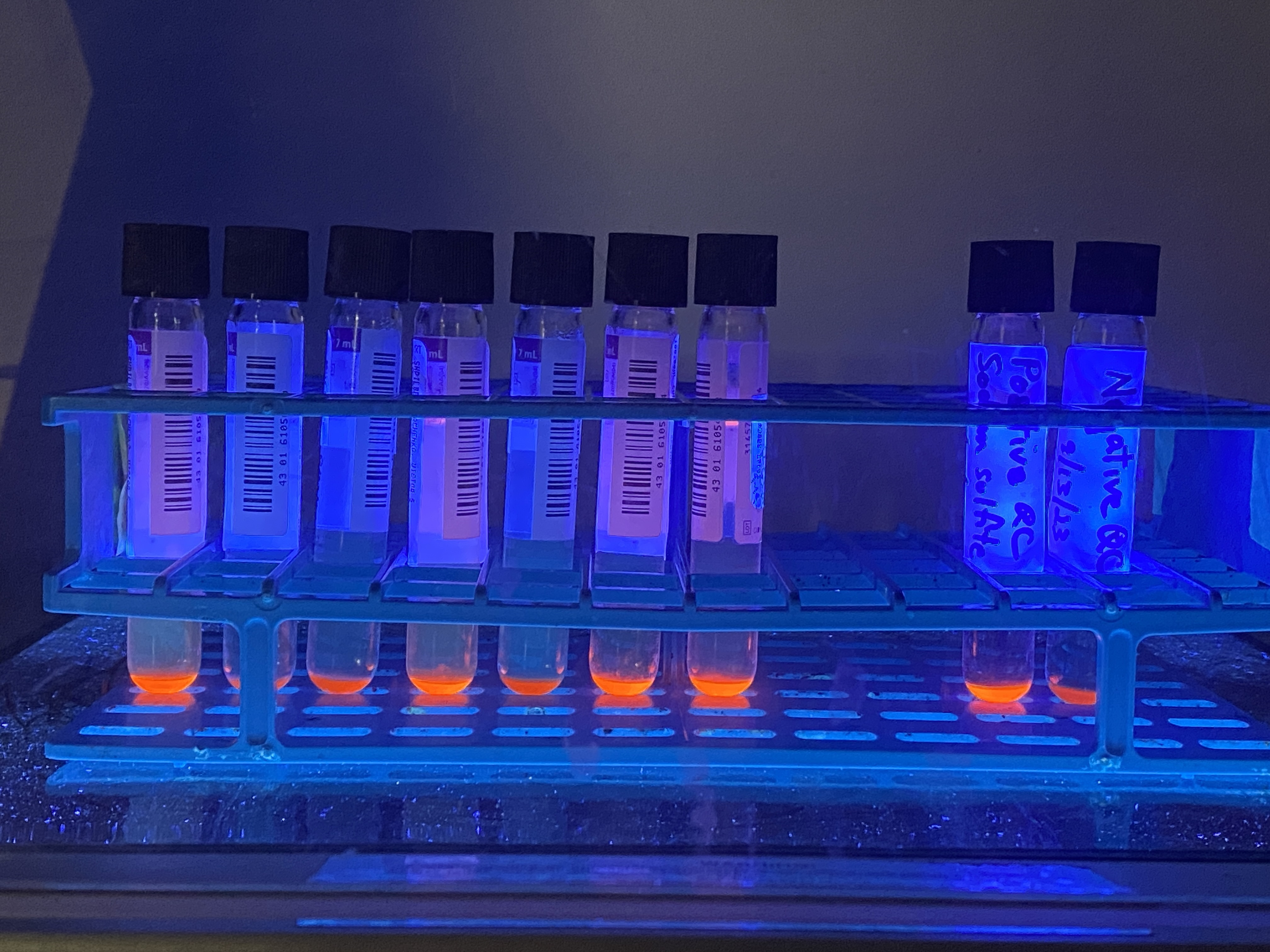
Mycobacteria Growth Indicator Tube (MGIT) samples in ultraviolet light. Emission of orange fluorescence indicates the presence of mycobacteria. The samples without fluorescence in this image still reflect some light from the others.

Mycobacteria Growth Indicator Tube (MGIT) is intended for the culture, detection and recovery of mycobacteria. The MGIT Mycobacteria Growth Indicator Tube contains 7 mL of modified Middlebrook 7H9 Broth base. The complete medium, with OADC enrichment and PANTA antibiotic mixture, is one of the most commonly used liquid media for the cultivation of mycobacteria.

All types of clinical specimens, pulmonary as well as extra-pulmonary (except blood and urine), can be processed for primary isolation in the MGIT tube using conventional methods. After processed specimen is inoculated, MGIT tube must be continuously monitored either manually or by automated instruments until positive or the end of the testing protocol.

== Principles of the procedure ==
A fluorescent compound is embedded in silicone on the bottom of 16 × 100 mm round bottom tubes. The fluorescent compound is sensitive to the presence of oxygen dissolved in the broth. Initially, the large amount of dissolved oxygen quenches emissions from the compound and little fluorescence can be detected. Later, actively respiring microorganisms consume the oxygen and allow the fluorescence to be detected.

Tubes are filled with samples in the broth and continuously incubated at 37 °C. The tubes are monitored for increasing fluorescence to determine if the tube is instrument positive; i.e., the test sample contains viable organisms. Fluorescence can be recorded by automated instruments such as Becton Dickinson's BACTEC MGIT 960 System, or manually using the BD BACTEC microMGIT fluorescence reader or a Wood's lamp or other long-wave UV light source.

== Instruments ==
=== BACTEC MGIT 960 System ===
This instrument is produced by Becton Dickinson (BD). It is specially designed to accommodate Mycobacteria Growth Indicator Tube (MGIT) and incubate them at 37 °C. The instrument scans the MGIT every 60 minutes for increased fluorescence. Analysis of the fluorescence is used to determine if the tube is instrument positive; i.e., the test sample contains viable organisms. An instrument-positive tube contains approximately 10^{5} to 10^{6} colony-forming units per milliliter (CFU/mL). Culture tubes which remain negative for a minimum of 42 days (up to 56 days) and which show no visible signs of positivity are removed from the instrument as negatives and discarded. Its usefulness has been evaluated in the scientific literature.
