= Mycolicibacter =

Scientific classification
- Domain: Bacteria
- Kingdom: Bacillati
- Phylum: Actinomycetota
- Class: Actinomycetes
- Order: Mycobacteriales
- Family: Mycobacteriaceae
- Genus: Mycolicibacter; Gupta et al. 2018

Type species
- Mycolicibacter terrae (Wayne 1966) Gupta et al. 2018

Species
- M. algericus (Sahraoui et al. 2011) Gupta et al. 2018; M. arupensis (Cloud et al. 2006) Gupta et al. 2018; M. engbaekii (Tortoli et al. 2013) Gupta et al. 2018; M. heraklionensis (Tortoli et al. 2013) Gupta et al. 2018; M. hiberniae (Kazda et al. 1993) Gupta et al. 2018; "M. icosiumassiliensis" Gupta et al. 2018; M. kumamotonensis (Masaki et al. 2007) Gupta et al. 2018; M. longobardus (Tortoli et al. 2013) Gupta et al. 2018; M. minnesotensis (Hannigan et al. 2013) Gupta et al. 2018; M. nonchromogenicus (Tsukamura 1965) Gupta et al. 2018; M. paraterrae (Lee et al. 2016) Gupta et al. 2018; M. senuensis (Mun et al. 2008) Gupta et al. 2018; "M. sinensis" Gupta et al. 2018; M. terrae (Wayne 1966) Gupta et al. 2018; "M. virginiensis" (Vasireddy et al. 2017)

Synonyms
- Mycobacterium terrae complex (MTeC)

Genus of bacteria

Mycolicibacter is a genus of gram-positive rod-shaped bacteria in the family Mycobacteriaceae from the order Mycobacteriales.

Members of Mycolicibacter were demarcated from the larger genus Mycobacterium in 2018 by Gupta et al. based on evidence from various phylogenetic trees constructed based on conserved genome sequences, comparative genomic analyses and average amino acid identity values. In addition to this genus, the study proposed the division of Mycobacterium into a total of five distinct genera, which was met with some resistance by some of the scientific community. The resistance was based on the grounds that Mycobacterium contains some clinically relevant species and name changes might cause confusion among clinicians and other researchers.

In 2020, Yamada et al. analyzed the fundamental morphological properties of the new genera, including the cell diameter, cell length, cell perimeter, cell circularity and aspect ratio, and determined that there were significant differences between the five genera, thus supporting the new division.

The name Mycolicibacter is derived from the Latin noun acidum mycolicum (translates to mycolic acid) and the Latin noun bacter (translates to rod). Together the name refers to a genus of mycolic acid containing rod-shaped bacteria.

== Biochemical characteristics and molecular signatures ==
Members of Mycolicibacter are slow-growing bacterial species (taking more than seven days to form colonies) and nonchromogenic (does not produce pigment). Some species grow at an intermediate rate, taking 5–15 days to form colonies. While most members of Mycolicibacter are non-pathogenic, some species have been isolated from animal hosts and human patients. They have a higher G+C content (ranging between 66.3–70.3 mol%) and relatively short genomes between the range of 3.87–5.11 Mbp.

Analyses of genome sequences from Mycolicibacter identified 26 conserved signature indels (CSIs) that are specific for this genus in the proteins such as non-ribosomal peptide synthetase, nucleoside hydrolase, TetR family transcriptional regulator, carbon starvation protein A, error-prone DNA polymerase, amidohydrolase, carboxymunconolacton decarboxylase family protein, polyketide cyclase, spirocyclase AveC family protein, TobH protein, UDP-N-acetylmuramate–L-alanine ligase, DUF2236 domain-containing protein, cobaltochelatase subunit CobN, alpha/beta hydrolase, potassium transporter Kef, a membrane protein, DUF222 domain-containing protein, MFS transporter, adenylate/guanylate cyclase domain-containing protein, DUF2029 domain-containing protein and hypothetical proteins. These CSIs provide a reliable molecular method for identifying and distinguishing members of Mycolicibacter from other genera in the family Mycobacteriaceae. Additionally, 15 unique conserved signature proteins (CSPs) were identified to be specific to most or all members of this genus.

== Phylogeny ==
The phylogeny of Mycolicibacter is based on whole-genome analysis. (Note: Mycolicibacter paraterrae and "Mycolicibacter virginiensis" are not included in this phylogenetic tree.)

- - Mycolicibacter
    - - - Mycolicibacter senuensis
        - - Mycolicibacter algericus
          - "Mycolicibacter sinensis"
      - - Mycolicibacter kumamotonensis
        - Mycolicibacter terrae
    - - Mycolicibacter longobardus
      - - - Mycolicibacter engbaekii
          - Mycolicibacter hiberniae
        - - - Mycolicibacter arupensis
            - Mycolicibacter minnesotensis
          - - Mycolicibacter nonchromogenicus
            - - "Mycolicibacter icosiumassiliensis"
              - Mycolicibacter heraklionensis
  - Mycolicibacillus (outgroup)
