= Mycolicibacterium =

Scientific classification
- Domain: Bacteria
- Kingdom: Bacillati
- Phylum: Actinomycetota
- Class: Actinomycetes
- Order: Mycobacteriales
- Family: Mycobacteriaceae
- Genus: Mycolicibacterium; Gupta et al. 2018

Type species
- Mycolicibacterium fortuitum (da Costa Cruz 1938) Gupta et al. 2018

Species
- See text.

Genus of bacteria

Mycolicibacterium is a genus of Gram-positive rod-shaped bacteria in the family Mycobacteriaceae from the order Mycobacteriales.

Members of Mycolicibacterium were demarcated from the larger genus Mycobacterium in 2018 by Gupta et al. based on evidence from various phylogenetic trees constructed based on conserved genome sequences, comparative genomic analyses and average amino acid identity values. In addition to this genus, the study proposed the division of Mycobacterium into a total of five distinct genera, which was met with some resistance by some of the scientific community. The resistance was based on the grounds that Mycobacterium contains some clinically relevant species and name changes might cause confusion among clinicians and other researchers.

In 2020, Yamada et al. analyzed the fundamental morphological properties of the new genera, including the cell diameter, cell length, cell perimeter, cell circularity and aspect ratio, and determined that there were significant differences between the five genera, thus supporting the new division.

The name Mycolicibacterium is derived from the Latin acidum mycolicum (translates to mycolic acid) and the Latin noun bacterium from the Greek noun "bacteria" (translates to small rod). Together the name refers to a genus of mycolic acid containing rod-shaped bacteria.

== Biochemical characteristics and molecular signatures ==
Mycolicibacterium is a genus of rapidly-growing bacteria, taking less than seven days to form colonies. Members are also non-chromogenic (does not produce pigment), and are positive for the 3 day arylsulfatase activity test, nitrate reductase and iron uptake. Most species are saprophytic and are able to process decaying organic matter for nutrients. While members of this genus are not considered to be pathogenic, some species have been reported to cause infections and diseases. The genome size for Mycolicibacterium is between 3.95–8.0 Mbp and their G+C content is between 65.4–70.3 mol%.

Four conserved signature indels (CSIs) were identified through genomic analyses as uniquely present in this genus in the following proteins: LacI family transcriptional regulator, cyclase, CDP-diacylglycerol–glycerol-3-phosphate 3-phosphatidyltransferase and CDP-diacylglycerol–serine O-phosphatidyltransferase. These CSIs serve as a reliable molecular means for distinguishing members of this Mycolicibacterium from other genera in the family Mycobacteriaceae and all other bacteria. Additionally, 10 unique conserved signature proteins (CSPs) were identified for this genus.

== Species ==
The phylogeny of Mycolicibacterium (Note: Not all species are included in this phylogenetic tree.)

- - Mycolicibacterium
    - - - - - Mycolicibacterium mageritense
            - Mycolicibacterium brisbanense
          - - - Mycolicibacterium houstonense
              - - - Mycolicibacterium peregrinum
                  - Mycolicibacterium fortuitum
                - - - Mycolicibacterium neworleansense
                    - - Mycolicibacterium setense
                      - Mycolicibacterium septicum
                  - - - Mycolicibacterium porcinum
                      - - Mycolicibacterium vulneris
                        - Mycolicibacterium boenickei
                    - - Mycolicibacterium farcinogenes
                      - - Mycolicibacterium senegalense
                        - Mycolicibacterium conceptionense
            - - Mycolicibacterium wolinksyi
              - - "Mycolicibacterium goodii"
                - Mycolicibacterium smegmatis
        - - - Mycolicibacterium mucogenicum
            - Mycolicibacterium llatzerense
          - - - Mycolicibacterium canariasense
              - Mycolicibacterium cosmeticum
            - - Mycolicibacterium diemhoferi
              - - Mycolicibacterium bacteremicum
                - Mycolicibacterium neoaurum
      - - - - - - Mycolicibacterium vaccae
                - Mycolicibacterium austroafricanum
              - - - Mycolicibacterium parafortuitum
                  - Mycolicibacterium gilvum
                - - Mycolicibacterium aurum
                  - Mycolicibacterium iranicum
            - - Mycolicibacterium chubuense
              - - Mycolicibacterium obuense
                - - Mycolicibacterium chlorophenolicum
                  - Mycolicibacterium rufum
          - - - Mycolicibacterium hassiacum
              - Mycolicibacterium thermoresistibile
            - - - Mycolicibacterium moriokaense
                - - Mycolicibacterium rhodesiae
                  - Mycolicibacterium tusciae
              - - - Mycolicibacterium elephantis
                  - Mycolicibacterium holstaticum
                - - - Mycolicibacterium celeriflavum
                    - - - Mycolicibacterium acapulcensis
                        - Mycolicibacterium novocastrense
                      - - "Mycolicibacterium komanii"
                        - Mycolicibacterium malmesburyense
                  - - - Mycolicibacterium flavescens
                      - Mycolicibacterium rutilum
                    - Mycolicibacterium phlei
        - - Mycolicibacterium doricum
          - Mycolicibacterium monacense
    - - - Mycolicibacterium confluentis
        - - Mycolicibacterium insubricum
          - Mycolicibacterium fallax
      - - Mycolicibacterium aromaticivorans
        - Mycolicibacterium litorale
  - Mycobacterium (outgroup)

Notes

Mycolicibacterium comprises the followings species:

- "M. acapulense" Gupta et al. 2018
- M. agri (Tsukamura 1981) Gupta et al. 2018
- M. aichiense (Tsukamura 1981) Gupta et al. 2018
- M. alvei (Ausina et al. 1992) Gupta et al. 2018
- M. anyangense (Kim et al. 2015) Gupta et al. 2018
- M. arabiense (Zhang et al. 2013) Gupta et al. 2018
- M. arcueilense (Konjek et al. 2016) Gupta et al. 2018
- M. aromaticivorans (Hennessee et al. 2009) Gupta et al. 2018
- M. aubagnense (Adékambi et al. 2006) Gupta et al. 2018
- M. aurum (Tsukamura 1966) Gupta et al. 2018
- M. austroafricanum (Tsukamura et al. 1983) Gupta et al. 2018
- M. bacteremicum (Brown-Elliott et al. 2012) Gupta et al. 2018
- M. baixiangningiae Cheng et al. 2021
- M. boenickei (Schinsky et al. 2004) Gupta et al. 2018
- M. brisbanense (Schinsky et al. 2004) Gupta et al. 2018
- M. brumae (Luquin et al. 1993) Gupta et al. 2018
- M. canariasense (Jiménez et al. 2004) Gupta et al. 2018
- M. celeriflavum (Shahraki et al. 2015) Gupta et al. 2018
- M. chitae (Tsukamura 1967) Gupta et al. 2018
- M. chlorophenolicum (Apajalahti et al. 1986) Gupta et al. 2018
- M. chubuense (Tsukamura 1981) Gupta et al. 2018
- M. conceptionense (Adékambi et al. 2006) Gupta et al. 2018
- M. confluentis (Kirschner et al. 1992) Gupta et al. 2018
- M. cosmeticum (Cooksey et al. 2004) Gupta et al. 2018
- M. crocinum (Hennessee et al. 2009) Gupta et al. 2018
- M. diernhoferi (Tsukamura et al. 1983) Gupta et al. 2018
- M. doricum (Tortoli et al. 2001) Gupta et al. 2018
- M. duvalii (Stanford and Gunthorpe 1971) Gupta et al. 2018
- M. elephantis (Shojaei et al. 2000) Gupta et al. 2018
- M. fallax (Lévy-Frébault et al. 1983) Gupta et al. 2018
- M. farcinogenes (Chamoiseau 1973) Gupta et al. 2018
- M. flavescens (Bojalil et al. 1962) Gupta et al. 2018
- M. fluoranthenivorans (Hormisch et al. 2006) Gupta et al. 2018
- M. fortuitum (da Costa Cruz 1938) Gupta et al. 2018
- M. frederiksbergense (Willumsen et al. 2001) Gupta et al. 2018
- M. gadium (Casal and Calero 1974) Gupta et al. 2018
- M. gilvum (Stanford and Gunthorpe 1971) Gupta et al. 2018
- "M. goodii" (Brown et al. 1999) Gupta et al. 2018
- "M. gossypii" Huang et al. 2021
- M. hassiacum (Schröder et al. 1997) Gupta et al. 2018
- M. helvum (Tran and Dahl 2016) Gupta et al. 2018
- M. hippocampi (Balcázar et al. 2014) Gupta et al. 2018
- M. hodleri (Kleespies et al. 1996) Gupta et al. 2018
- M. holsaticum (Richter et al. 2002) Gupta et al. 2018
- M. houstonense (Schinsky et al. 2004) Gupta et al. 2018
- M. insubricum (Tortoli et al. 2009) Gupta et al. 2018
- M. iranicum (Shojaei et al. 2013) Gupta et al. 2018
- "M. komanii" (Gcebe et al. 2018) Gupta et al. 2018
- M. komossense (Kazda and Müller 1979) Gupta et al. 2018
- M. litorale (Zhang et al. 2012) Gupta et al. 2018
- M. llatzerense (Gomila et al. 2008) Gupta et al. 2018
- M. lutetiense (Konjek et al. 2016) Gupta et al. 2018
- M. madagascariense (Kazda et al. 1992) Gupta et al. 2018
- M. mageritense (Domenech et al. 1997) Gupta et al. 2018
- M. malmesburyense (Gcebe et al. 2017) Gupta et al. 2018
- M. mengxianglii Cheng et al. 2021
- M. monacense (Reischl et al. 2006) Gupta et al. 2018
- "M. montmartrense" (Konjek et al. 2016) Gupta et al. 2018
- M. moriokaense (Tsukamura et al. 1986) Gupta et al. 2018
- M. mucogenicum (Springer et al. 1995) Gupta et al. 2018
- M. murale (Vuorio et al. 1999) Gupta et al. 2018
- M. neoaurum (Tsukamura 1972) Gupta et al. 2018
- M. neworleansense (Schinsky et al. 2004) Gupta et al. 2018
- M. nivoides Dahl et al. 2021
- M. novocastrense (Shojaei et al. 1997) Gupta et al. 2018
- M. obuense (Tsukamura and Mizuno 1981) Gupta et al. 2018
- M. oryzae (Ramaprasad et al. 2016) Gupta et al. 2018
- M. pallens (Hennessee et al. 2009) Gupta et al. 2018
- M. parafortuitum (Tsukamura 1966) Gupta et al. 2018
- M. peregrinum (Kusunoki and Ezaki 1992) Gupta et al. 2018
- M. phlei (Lehmann and Neumann 1899) Gupta et al. 2018
- M. phocaicum (Adékambi et al. 2006) Gupta et al. 2018
- M. porcinum (Tsukamura et al. 1983) Gupta et al. 2018
- M. poriferae (Padgitt and Moshier 1987) Gupta et al. 2018
- M. psychrotolerans (Trujillo et al. 2004) Gupta et al. 2018
- M. pulveris (Tsukamura et al. 1983) Gupta et al. 2018
- M. pyrenivorans (Derz et al. 2004) Gupta et al. 2018
- M. rhodesiae (Tsukamura 1981) Gupta et al. 2018
- M. rufum (Hennessee et al. 2009) Gupta et al. 2018
- M. rutilum (Hennessee et al. 2009) Gupta et al. 2018
- M. sarraceniae (Tran and Dahl 2016) Gupta et al. 2018
- M. sediminis (Zhang et al. 2013) Gupta et al. 2018
- M. senegalense (Chamoiseau 1973) Gupta et al. 2018
- M. septicum (Schinsky et al. 2000) Gupta et al. 2018
- M. setense (Lamy et al. 2008) Gupta et al. 2018
- M. smegmatis (Trevisan 1889) Gupta et al. 2018
- M. sphagni (Kazda 1980) Gupta et al. 2018
- M. stellerae Nouioui et al. 2019
- M. thermoresistibile (Tsukamura 1966) Gupta et al. 2018
- M. tokaiense (Tsukamura 1981) Gupta et al. 2018
- M. tusciae (Tortoli et al. 1999) Gupta et al. 2018
- M. vaccae (Bönicke and Juhasz 1964) Gupta et al. 2018
- "M. vinylchloridicum" Cortes-Albayay et al. 2021
- M. vulneris (van Ingen et al. 2009) Gupta et al. 2018
- M. wolinskyi (Brown et al. 1999) Gupta et al. 2018
