= Mycolicibacterium agri =

Scientific classification
- Domain: Bacteria
- Kingdom: Bacillati
- Phylum: Actinomycetota
- Class: Actinomycetia
- Order: Mycobacteriales
- Family: Mycobacteriaceae
- Genus: Mycolicibacterium
- Species: M. agri

Binomial name
- Mycolicibacterium agri (Tsukamura 1981) Gupta et al. 2018

Type strain
- 90012; ATCC 27406; CCUG 37673 A CCUG 37673 B CIP 105391; DSM 44515; JCM 6377

Synonyms
- "Mycobacterium agri" Tsukamura 1972; Mycobacterium agri (ex Tsukamura 1972) Tsukamura 1981

Species of bacterium

Mycolicibacterium agri (formerly Mycobacterium agri) is a species of bacteria from the phylum Actinomycetota that was first isolated from soil. It is non-pigmented and grows rapidly at 25–45 °C on Ogawa egg medium. It has also been isolated from a human skin infection, and raw milk M. agri is capable of degrading octocrylene.
