= Mycocerosate synthase =

mycocerosate synthase

Identifiers
- EC no.: 2.3.1.111
- CAS no.: 95229-19-9

Databases
- IntEnz: IntEnz view
- BRENDA: BRENDA entry
- ExPASy: NiceZyme view
- KEGG: KEGG entry
- MetaCyc: metabolic pathway
- PRIAM: profile
- PDB structures: RCSB PDB PDBe PDBsum
- Gene Ontology: AmiGO / QuickGO
Search
- PMC: articles
- PubMed: articles
- NCBI: proteins

In enzymology, a mycocerosate synthase (EC 2.3.1.111) is an enzyme that catalyzes the chemical reaction

long-chain acyl-[mycocerosate synthase] + n methylmalonyl-CoA + 2n NADPH + 2n H^{+} $\rightleftharpoons$ multi-methyl-branched acyl-[mycocerosate synthase] + n CoA + n CO_{2} + 2n NADP^{+}

The 4 substrates of this enzyme are acyl-CoA, methylmalonyl-CoA, NADPH, and H^{+}, whereas its 4 products are multi-methyl-branched acyl-[mycocerosate synthase], CoA, CO_{2}, and NADP^{+}.

This enzyme belongs to the family of transferases, specifically those acyltransferases transferring groups other than aminoacyl groups. The systematic name of this enzyme class is acyl-CoA:methylmalonyl-CoA C-acyltransferase (decarboxylating, oxoacyl- and enoyl-reducing). This enzyme is also called mycocerosic acid synthase.
