= Mycobacterium scrofulaceum =

Scientific classification
- Domain: Bacteria
- Kingdom: Bacillati
- Phylum: Actinomycetota
- Class: Actinomycetes
- Order: Mycobacteriales
- Family: Mycobacteriaceae
- Genus: Mycobacterium
- Species: M. scrofulaceum

Binomial name
- Mycobacterium scrofulaceum Prissick and Masson 1956

Species of bacterium

Mycobacterium scrofulaceum is a species of Mycobacterium.

It is the most common cause of mycobacterial cervical lymphadenitis in children.

It is sometimes included in the "MAIS group" with Mycobacterium avium and Mycobacterium intracellulare.

== Treatment ==
Due to the rarity of infection, no prospective studies have been undertaken and therefore treatment choices remain somewhat controversial. For childhood infection, surgery is the recommended treatment, in which the lesion is excised without chemotherapy. The success rate for this treatment is 95%. Drugs which are used in treatment of Mycobacterium scrofulaceum include isoniazid, rifampin and streptomycin.
