= Ruth E. Gordon =

American bacteriologist

Ruth Evelyn Gordon (1910–2003) was an American bacterial taxonomist. She was member of the American Type Culture Collection. The bacterial genus Gordonia (formerly Gordona) and species Mycobacterium gordonae are named after her.

Gordon received her PhD in bacteriology from Cornell University in 1934.

== Career ==
Gordon worked at the Division of Soil Microbiology at the United States Department of Agriculture from 1939 to 1942. She studied streptomycetes, which became her area of emphasis. In 1946, she began working for the American Type Culture Collection (ATCC) as a bacteriologist. She was promoted to curator in 1947. In 1954, she became an assistant professor at Rutgers University. She became a full professor in 1971. Gordon retired in 1981, but continued to work as a visiting investigator for the ATCC.

== Research ==
Gordon had a role in many different research studies throughout her career. In 1952, she was involved in a study focusing on aerobic sporeforming bacteria. This research study worked to identify, classify, and name types of aerobic sporeforming bacteria found in the soil.

In 1953, Gordon assisted in research on rapidly growing, acid-fast bacteria. In this study, she helped collaborate information on the presence of types of bacteria that grow quickly in acid, and helped with expressing the importance of naming and classifying these types of bacteria.

== Publications ==
- A Study of Some Acid-Fast Actinomycetes from Soil with Special Reference to Pathogenicity for Animals (1936)
- A Study of Some of the Properties of the Toxic Substances Produced by Salmonella Paratyphi A and B (1937)
- The Toxicity of Young Cells of Salmonella Paratyphi A and B When Lysed by Bacteriophage (1938)
- Aerobic Mesophilic Sporeforming Bacteria (1946)
