= Mycolicibacterium aurum =

Scientific classification
- Domain: Bacteria
- Kingdom: Bacillati
- Phylum: Actinomycetota
- Class: Actinomycetes
- Order: Mycobacteriales
- Family: Mycobacteriaceae
- Genus: Mycolicibacterium
- Species: M. aurum

Binomial name
- Mycolicibacterium aurum (Tsukamura 1966) Gupta et al. 2018

Type strain
- ATCC 23366; CCUG 37666; CIP 104465; DSM 43999; HAMBI 2275; JCM 6366; LMG 19255; NCTC 10437; NRRL B-4037

Synonyms
- Mycobacterium aurum Tsukamura 1966 (Approved Lists 1980)

Species of bacterium

Mycolicibacterium aurum is a species of the phylum Actinomycetota (Gram-positive bacteria with high guanine and cytosine content, one of the dominant phyla of all bacteria), belonging to the genus Mycolicibacterium.

The species is an acid fast, gram positive bacteria that forms long chains. Though related to Mycobacterium tuberculosis, it does not cause tuberculosis.
