= CDP-diacylglycerol—glycerol-3-phosphate 3-phosphatidyltransferase =

Enzyme

CDP-diacylglycerol-glycerol-3-phosphate 3-phosphatidyltransferase

Identifiers
- EC no.: 2.7.8.5
- CAS no.: 9068-49-9
- Alt. names: glycerophosphate phosphatidyltransferase; 3-phosphatidyl-1'-glycerol-3'-phosphate synthase; CDPdiacylglycerol:glycerol-3-phosphate phosphatidyltransferase; cytidine 5'-diphospho-1,2-diacyl-sn-glycerol; (CDPdiglyceride):sn-glycerol-3-phosphate phosphatidyltransferase; phosphatidylglycerophosphate synthase; phosphatidylglycerolphosphate synthase; PGP synthase; CDPdiacylglycerol-sn-glycerol-3-phosphate 3-phosphatidyltransferase; CDPdiacylglycerol:sn-glycero-3-phosphate phosphatidyltransferase; glycerol phosphate phosphatidyltransferase; glycerol 3-phosphate phosphatidyltransferase; phosphatidylglycerol phosphate synthase; phosphatidylglycerol phosphate synthetase; phosphatidylglycerophosphate synthetase; sn-glycerol-3-phosphate phosphatidyltransferase

Databases
- IntEnz: IntEnz view
- BRENDA: BRENDA entry
- ExPASy: NiceZyme view
- KEGG: KEGG entry
- MetaCyc: metabolic pathway
- PRIAM: profile
- PDB structures: RCSB PDB PDBe PDBsum
- Gene Ontology: AmiGO / QuickGO
Search
- PMC: articles
- PubMed: articles
- NCBI: proteins

In enzymology, a CDP-diacylglycerol—glycerol-3-phosphate 3-phosphatidyltransferase (EC 2.7.8.5) is an enzyme that catalyzes the chemical reaction

CDP-diacylglycerol + sn-glycerol 3-phosphate $\rightleftharpoons$ CMP + 3(3-sn-phosphatidyl)-sn-glycerol 1-phosphate

Thus, the two substrates of this enzyme are CDP-diacylglycerol and sn-glycerol 3-phosphate, whereas its two products are CMP and 3(3-sn-phosphatidyl)-sn-glycerol 1-phosphate.

This enzyme belongs to the family of transferases, specifically those transferring non-standard substituted phosphate groups. This enzyme participates in glycerophospholipid metabolism.
