= Mycobacterium gordonae =

Scientific classification
- Domain: Bacteria
- Kingdom: Bacillati
- Phylum: Actinomycetota
- Class: Actinomycetia
- Order: Mycobacteriales
- Family: Mycobacteriaceae
- Genus: Mycobacterium
- Species: M. gordonae

Binomial name
- Mycobacterium gordonae Bojalil et al. 1962, ATCC 14470

Species of bacterium

Mycobacterium gordonae is a species of Mycobacterium named for Ruth E. Gordon. It is a species of the phylum Actinomycetota (Gram-positive bacteria with high guanine and cytosine content, one of the dominant phyla of all bacteria), belonging to the genus Mycobacterium.

== Description ==
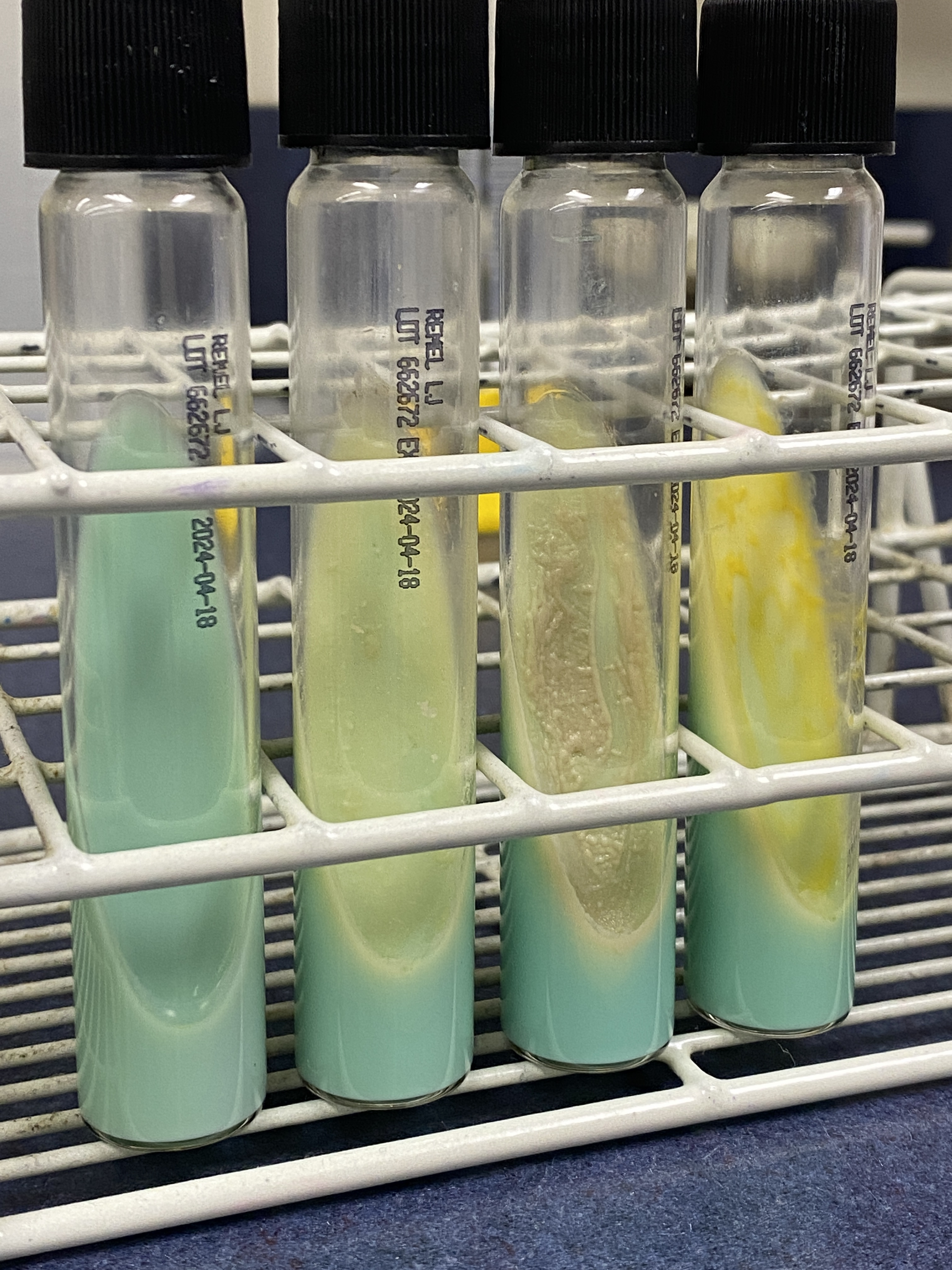
Slant tubes of Löwenstein-Jensen medium. From left to right: Negative control; M. tuberculosis: Dry-appearing colonies; Mycobacterium avium complex: Wet-appearing colonies; M. gordonae: Yellowish colonies

Gram-positive, nonmotile and moderate to long acid-fast rods.

- Commonly found in tap water and soil. Casual resident in human sputum and gastric lavage specimens.

Colony characteristics

- Smooth, with yellow or orange scotochromogenic colonies. Even though they are scotochromogenic pigment is intensified by growing in continuous light.

Physiology

- Growth on Löwenstein-Jensen medium and Middlebrook 7H10 agar within 7 or more days at 37 °C (optimal 25 °C).
- Does not grow in the presence of ethambutol (1 mg/L), isoniazid (10 mg/L) and sodium chloride (5%).
- Some strains can grow using carbon monoxide as a carbon and energy source.

Differential characteristics

- A commercial hybridisation assay (AccuProbe) to identify M. gordonae exists.
- Intraspecies variability in 16S rDNA sequences

== Pathogenesis ==
- Rarely if ever implicated in disease processes even if patients are immunocompromised. Widely distributed in environment and usually a contaminant in laboratory specimens.
- Biosafety level 2

== Type strain ==
Strain ATCC 14470 = CCUG 21801 = CCUG 21811 = CIP 104529 = DSM 44160 = JCM 6382 = NCTC 10267.
