= Scotochromogenic =

Bacteria that develop pigment in darkness

Scotochromogenic bacteria develop pigment in the dark. Runyon Group II nontuberculous mycobacteria such as Mycobacterium gordonae are examples but the term could apply to many other organisms.
