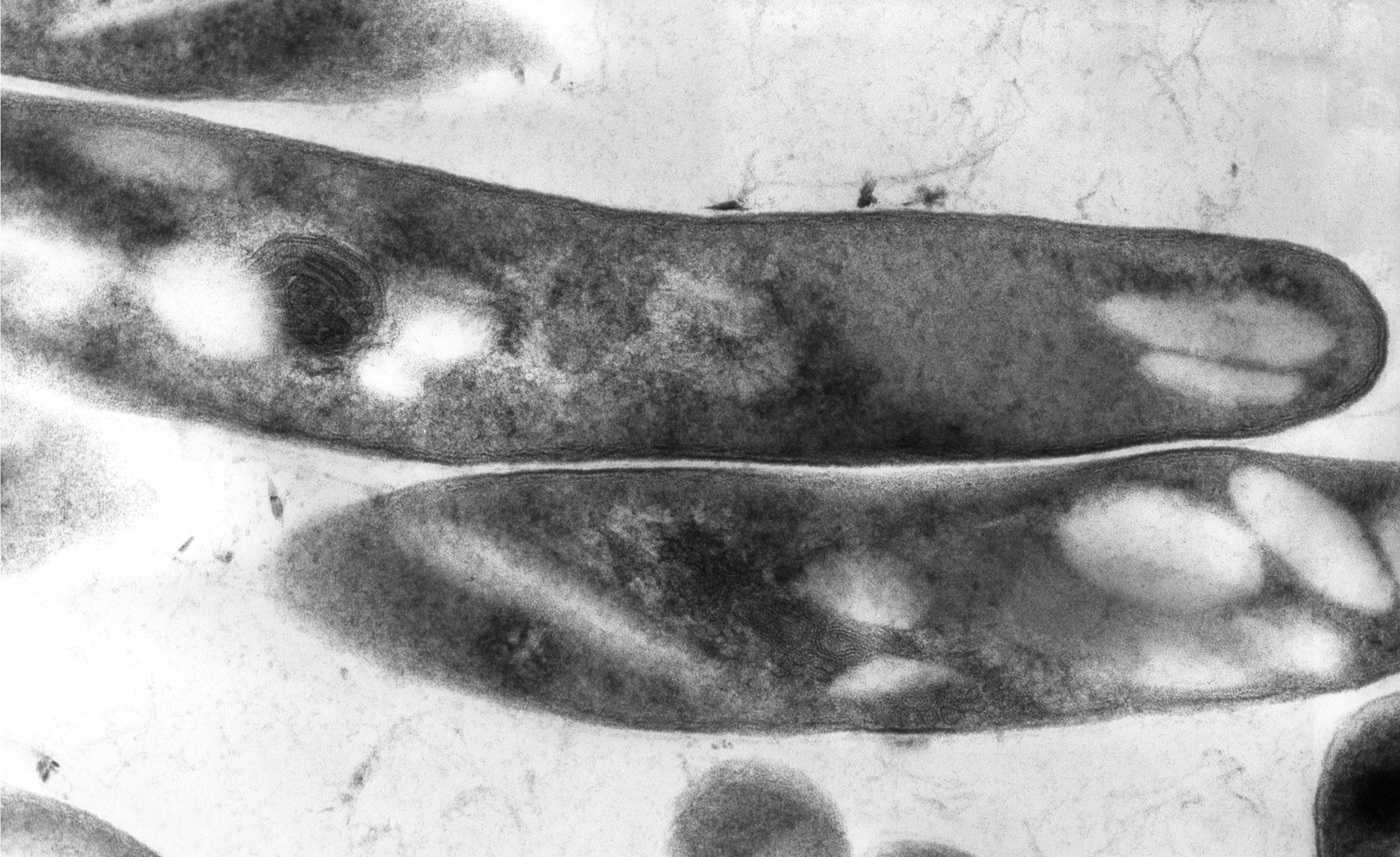
- TEM micrograph of M. tuberculosis

Scientific classification
- Domain: Bacteria
- Kingdom: Bacillati
- Phylum: Actinomycetota
- Class: Actinomycetes
- Order: Mycobacteriales
- Family: Mycobacteriaceae
- Genus: Mycobacterium; Lehmann & Neumann 1896

Species
- Over 190 species, see LPSN

Synonyms
- Mycolicibacterium Gupta et al. 2018; Mycolicibacillus Gupta et al. 2018; Mycolicibacter Gupta et al. 2018; Mycobacteroides Gupta et al. 2018

= Mycobacterium =

Genus of bacteria

Mycobacterium is a genus of over 190 species of Gram-positive bacteria in the phylum Actinomycetota, assigned its own family, Mycobacteriaceae. This genus includes pathogens known to cause serious diseases in mammals, including tuberculosis (M. tuberculosis) and leprosy (M. leprae) in humans. The Greek prefix myco- means 'fungus', alluding to this genus's mold-like colony surfaces. Since this genus has cell walls with a waxy lipid-rich outer layer containing high concentrations of mycolic acid, acid-fast staining is used to emphasize their resistance to acids, compared to other cell types.

Mycobacterial species are generally aerobic, non-motile, and capable of growing with minimal nutrition. The genus is divided based on each species's pigment production and growth rate. While most Mycobacterium species are non-pathogenic, the genus's characteristic complex cell wall contributes to evasion from host defenses.

== Microbiology ==
=== Morphology ===
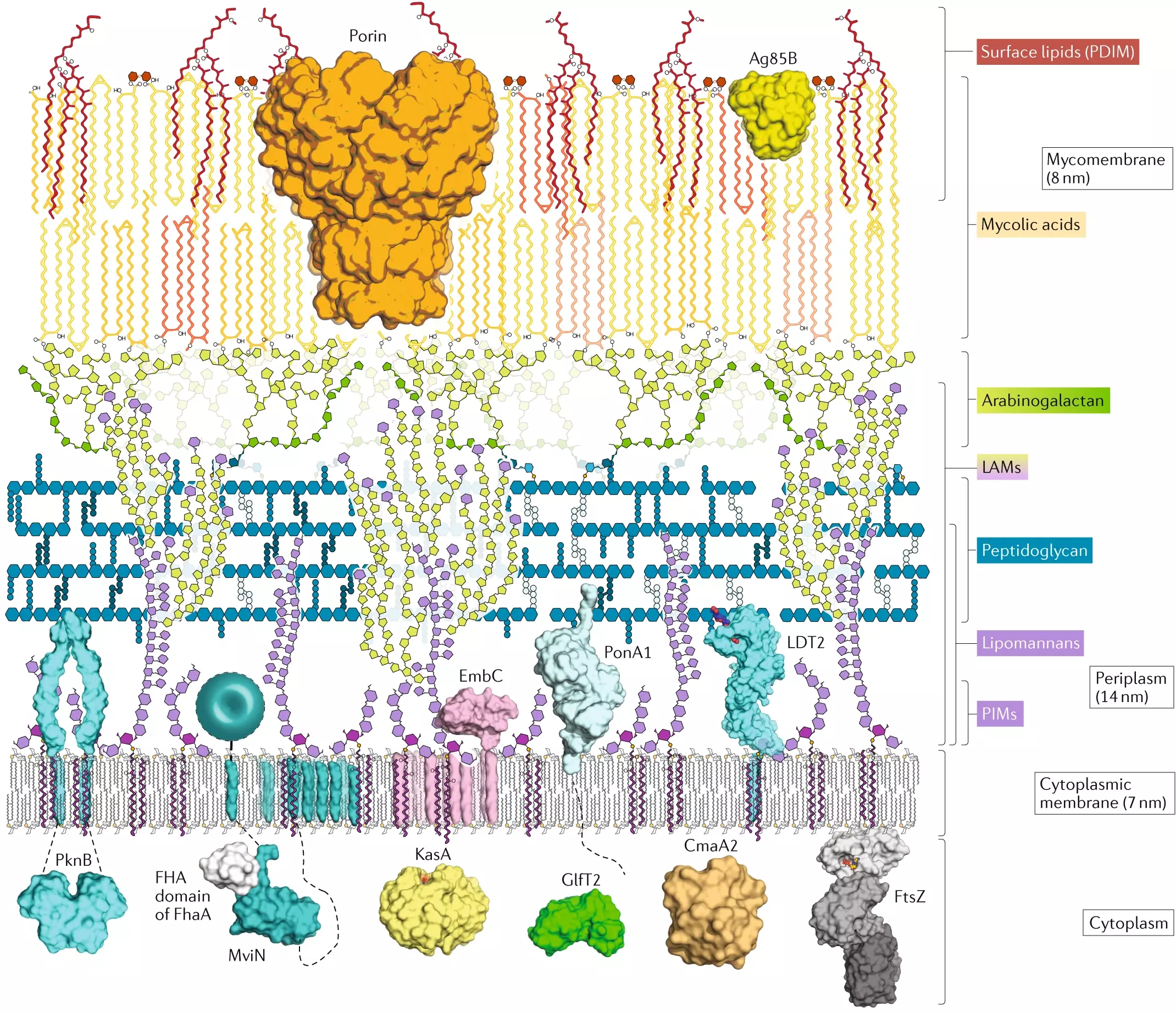
Model of the Mycobacterium spp. cell envelope with 3-D protein structures

Mycobacteria are aerobic with 0.2–0.6 μm wide and 1.0–10 μm long rod shapes. They are generally non-motile, except for the species Mycobacterium marinum, which has been shown to be motile within macrophages. Mycobacteria possess capsules and most do not form endospores. M. marinum and perhaps M. bovis have been shown to sporulate; however, this has been contested by further research. The distinguishing characteristic of all Mycobacterium species is a thick, hydrophobic, and mycolic acid-rich cell wall made of peptidoglycan and arabinogalactan, with these unique components offering targets for new tuberculosis drugs.

=== Physiology ===
Many Mycobacterium species readily grow with minimal nutrients, using ammonia and/or amino acids as nitrogen sources and glycerol as a carbon source in the presence of mineral salts. Temperatures for optimal growth vary between species and media conditions, ranging from 25 to 45 °C.

Most Mycobacterium species, including most clinically relevant species, can be cultured in blood agar. However, some species grow very slowly due to extremely long reproductive cycles, such as M. leprae requiring 12 days per division cycle compared to 20 minutes for some E. coli strains.

=== Ecology ===
Whereas Mycobacterium tuberculosis and M. leprae are pathogenic, most mycobacteria do not cause disease unless they enter skin lesions of those with pulmonary and/or immune dysfunction, despite being widespread across aquatic and terrestrial environments. Through biofilm formation, cell wall resistance to chlorine, and association with amoebas, mycobacteria can survive a variety of environmental stressors. The agar media used for most water testing does not support the growth of mycobacteria, allowing it to go undetected in municipal and hospital systems.

=== Genomics ===
Hundreds of Mycobacterium genomes have been completely sequenced.

The genome sizes of mycobacteria range from relatively small ones (e.g. in M. leprae) to quite large ones, such as that as M. vulneris, encoding 6,653 proteins, larger than the ~6000 proteins of eukaryotic yeast.

Protein-Coding Genomic Information
Organism	Number of Protein Coding Genes
M. intracellulare	5,289
M. colombiense	5,084
M. leprae	1,603
M. tuberculosis	3,995
M. smegmatis	6,602
M. chelonae	4,948

== Pathogenicity ==
=== Mycobacterium tuberculosis complex ===
Mycobacterium tuberculosis can remain latent in human hosts for decades after an initial infection, and reactivate under conducive conditions (e.g. immune suppression, advanced age, malnutrition). It has been estimated that a third of the world population has latent tuberculosis (TB). M. tuberculosis has many virulence factors, which can be divided across lipid and fatty acid metabolism, cell envelope proteins, macrophage inhibitors, kinase proteins, proteases, metal-transporter proteins, and gene expression regulators. Several lineages such as M. t. var. bovis (bovine TB) were considered separate species in the M. tuberculosis complex until they were finally merged into the main species in 2018.

=== Leprosy ===
The development of leprosy is caused by infection with either Mycobacterium leprae or Mycobacterium lepromatosis, two closely related bacteria. Roughly 200,000 new cases of infection are reported each year, and 80% of new cases are reported in Brazil, India, and Indonesia. M. leprae infection localizes within the skin macrophages and Schwann cells found in peripheral nerve tissue.

=== Nontuberculosis Mycobacteria ===
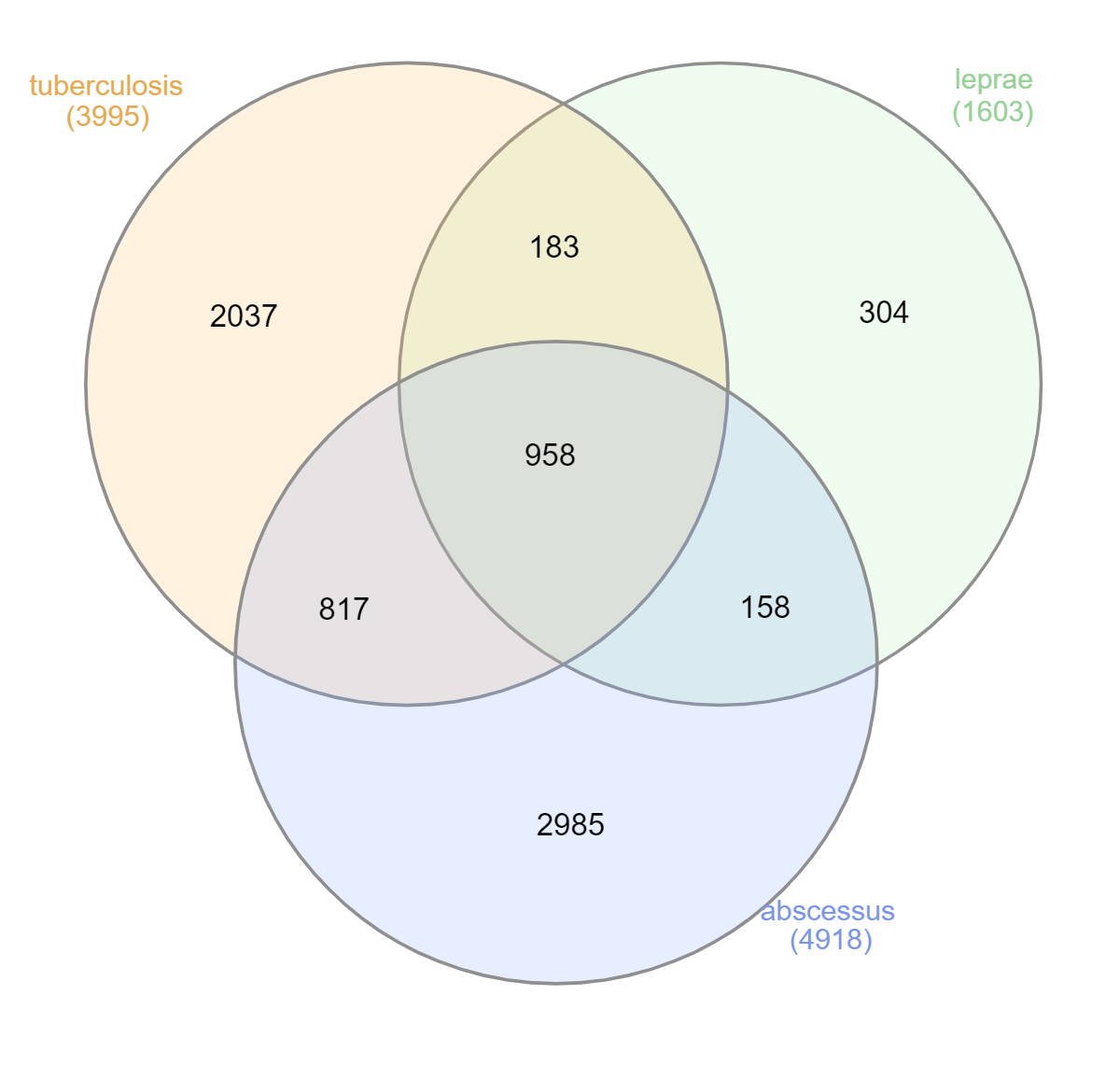
Orthologous proteins found in each species (based on OMA identifiers). Unique proteins for each species are localized in the outer section for each species.

Nontuberculosis Mycobacteria (NTM), which exclude M. tuberculosis, M. leprae, and M. lepromatosis, can infect mammalian hosts. These bacteria are referred to as "atypical mycobacteria." Although person-to-person transmission is rare, transmission of M. abscessus has been observed between patients with cystic fibrosis. The four primary diseases observed in humans are chronic pulmonary disease, disseminated disease in immunocompromised patients, skin and soft tissue infections, and superficial lymphadenitis. 80–90% of recorded NTM infections manifest as pulmonary diseases.

M. abscessus is the most virulent rapidly-growing mycobacterium (RGM), as well as the leading cause of RGM based pulmonary infections. Although it has been traditionally viewed as an opportunistic pathogen like other NTMs, analysis of various virulence factors (VFs) have shifted this view to that of a true pathogen. This is due to the presence of known mycobacterial VFs and other non-mycobacterial VFs found in other prokaryotic pathogens.

=== Virulence factors ===
Mycobacteria have cell walls with peptidoglycan, arabinogalactan, and mycolic acid; a waxy outer mycomembrane of mycolic acid; and an outermost capsule of glucans and secreted proteins for virulence. It constantly remodels these layers to survive in stressful environments and avoid host immune defenses. This cell wall structure results in colony surfaces resembling fungi, leading to the genus' use of the Greek prefix myco-. This unique structure makes penicillins ineffective, instead requiring a multi-drug antibiotic treatment of isoniazid to inhibit mycolic acid synthesis, rifampicin to interfere with transcription, ethambutol to hinder arabinogalactan synthesis, and pyrazinamide to impede coenzyme A synthesis.

Mycobacterial Infection Information
Organism	Common Symptoms of Infection	Known Treatments	Reported Cases (Region, Year)
M. tuberculosis	Fatigue, weight loss, fever, hemoptysis, chest pain.	isoniazid INH, rifampin, pyrazinamide, ethambutol.	1.6 Million (Global, 2021)
M. leprae M. lepromatosis	Skin discoloration, nodule development, dry skin, loss of eyebrows and/or eyelashes, numbness, nosebleeds, paralysis, blindness, nerve pain.	dapson, rifampicin, clofazimine.	133,802 (Global, 2021)
M. avium complex	Tender skin, development of boils or pus-filled vesicles, fevers, chills, muscle aches.	clarithromycin, azithromycin, amikacin, cefoxitin, imipenem.	3000 (US, Annual estimated)
M. abscessus complex	Coughing, hemoptysis, fever, cavitary lesions.	clarithromycin, amikacin, cefoxitin, imipenem.	Unknown

== History ==
Cladogram of Key Species

- - Mycobacterium
    - - M. chelonae
      - - M. fortuitum
        - - M. flavescens
          - M. smegmatis
    - - - - - - - - - M. avium
                    - M. intracellulare
                  - - M. kansasii
                    - M. scrofulaceum
                - - M. malmoense
                  - M. szulgai
              - - M. marinum
                - M. tuberculosis
            - M. gordonae
          - M. simiae
        - M. xenopi
      - - M. nonchromogenicum
        - M. terrae
  - outgroup
    Nocardia asteroides

Mycobacteria have historically been categorized through phenotypic testing, such as the Runyon classification of analyzing growth rate and production of yellow/orange carotenoid pigments. Group I contains photochromogens (pigment production induced by light), Group II comprises scotochromogens (constitutive pigment production), and the non-chromogens of Groups III and IV have a pale yellow/tan pigment, regardless of light exposure. Group IV species are "rapidly-growing" mycobacteria compared to the "slowly-growing" Group III species because samples grow into visible colonies in less than seven days.

Because the International Code of Nomenclature of Prokaryotes (ICNP) currently recognizes 195 Mycobacterium species, classification and identification systems now rely on DNA sequencing and computational phylogenetics. The major disease-causing groups are the M. tuberculosis complex (tuberculosis), M. avium complex (mycobacterium avium-intracellulare infection), M. leprae and M. lepromatosis (leprosy), and M. abscessus (chronic lung infection).

Microbiologist Enrico Tortoli has constructed a phylogenetic tree of the genus' key species based on the earlier genetic sequencing of Rogall, et al. (1990), alongside new phylogentic trees based on Tortoli's 2017 sequencing of 148 Mycobacterium species:

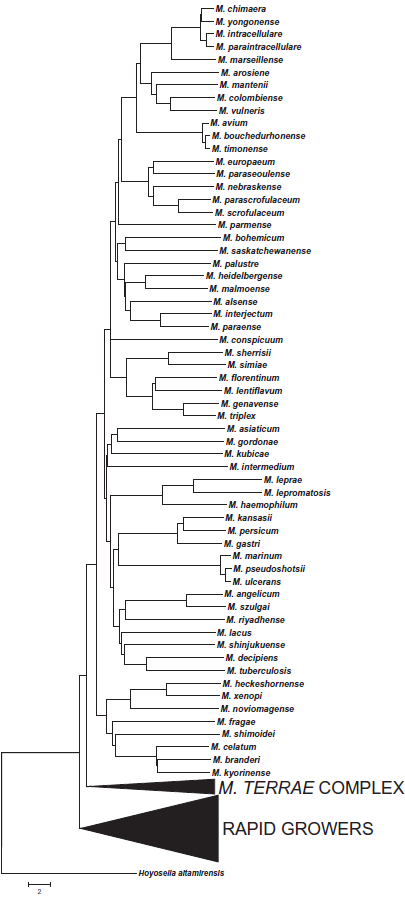
Phylogenetic tree of slowly-growing members of the Mycobacterium genus

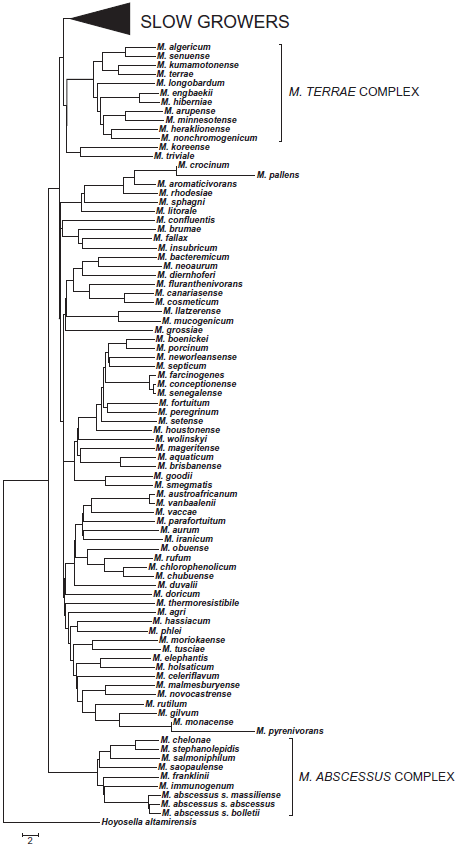
Phylogenetic tree of rapidly-growing members of the Mycobacterium genus, alongside the M. terrae complex

=== Proposed division of the genus ===
Gupta et al. have proposed dividing Mycobacterium into five genera, based on an analysis of 150 species in this genus. Due to controversy over complicating clinical diagnoses and treatment, all of the renamed species have retained their original identity in the Mycobacterium genus as a valid taxonomic synonym:

- Mycobacterium based on the Slowly-Growing Tuberculosis-Simiae clade
- Mycobacteroides based on the Rapidly-Growing Abscessus-Chelonae clade
- Mycolicibacillus based on the Slowly-Growing Triviale clade
- Mycolicibacter based on the Slowly-Growing Terrae clade
- Mycolicibacterium based on the Rapidly-Growing Fortuitum-Vaccae clade

== Diagnosis ==
The two most common methods for visualizing these acid-fast bacilli as bright red against a blue background are the Ziehl-Neelsen stain and modified Kinyoun stain. Fite's stain is used to color M. leprae cells as pink against a blue background. Rapid Modified Auramine O Fluorescent staining has specific binding to slowly-growing mycobacteria for yellow staining against a dark background. Newer methods include Gomori-Methenamine Silver staining and Perioidic Acid Schiff staining to color Mycobacterium avium complex (MAC) cells black and pink, respectively.

While some mycobacteria can take up to eight weeks to grow visible colonies from a cultured sample, most clinically relevant species will grow within the first four weeks, allowing physicians to consider alternative causes if negative readings continue past the first month. Growth media include Löwenstein–Jensen medium and mycobacteria growth indicator tube (MGIT).

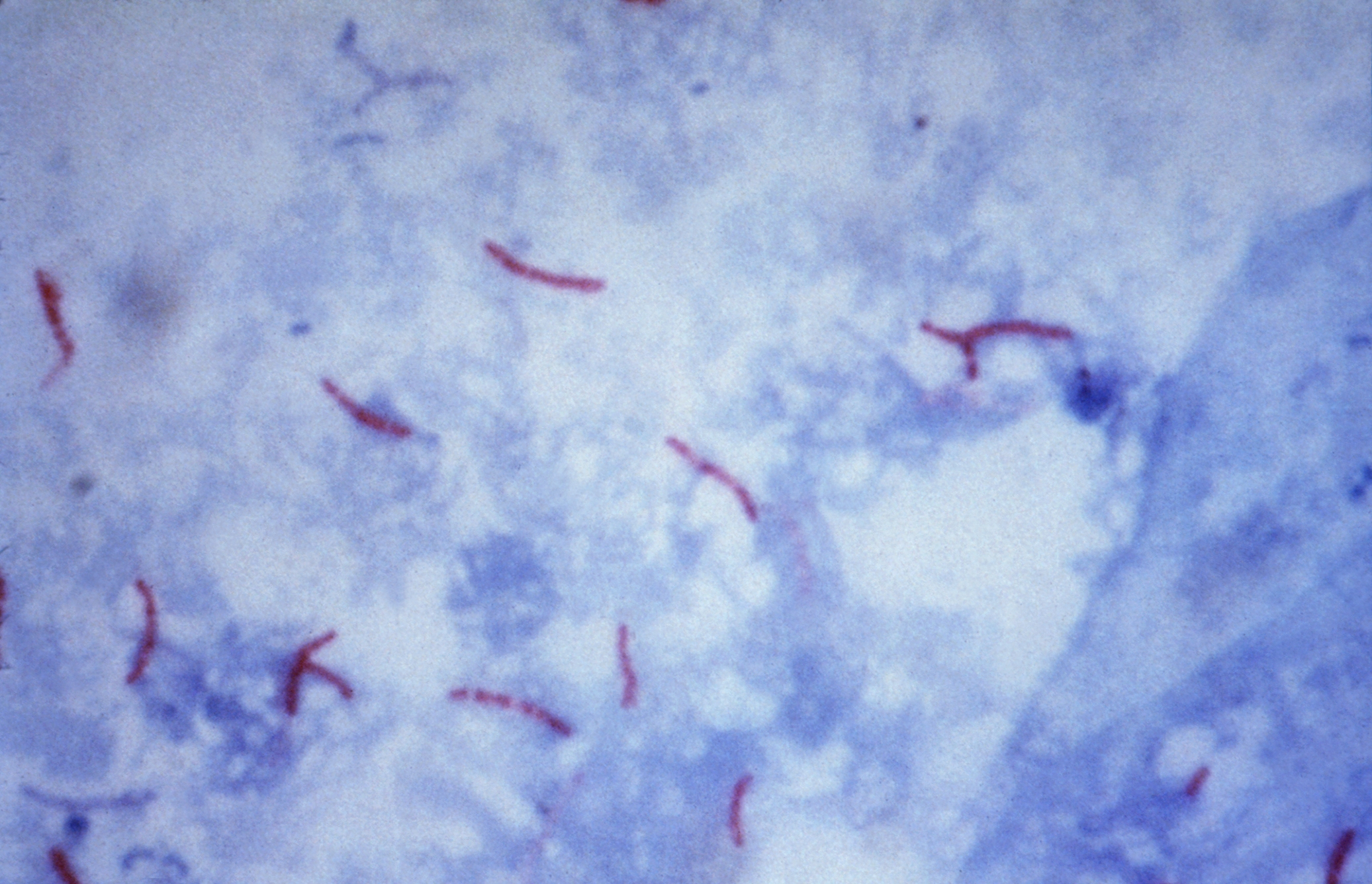
Mycobacterium tuberculosis on Ziehl-Neelsen stain

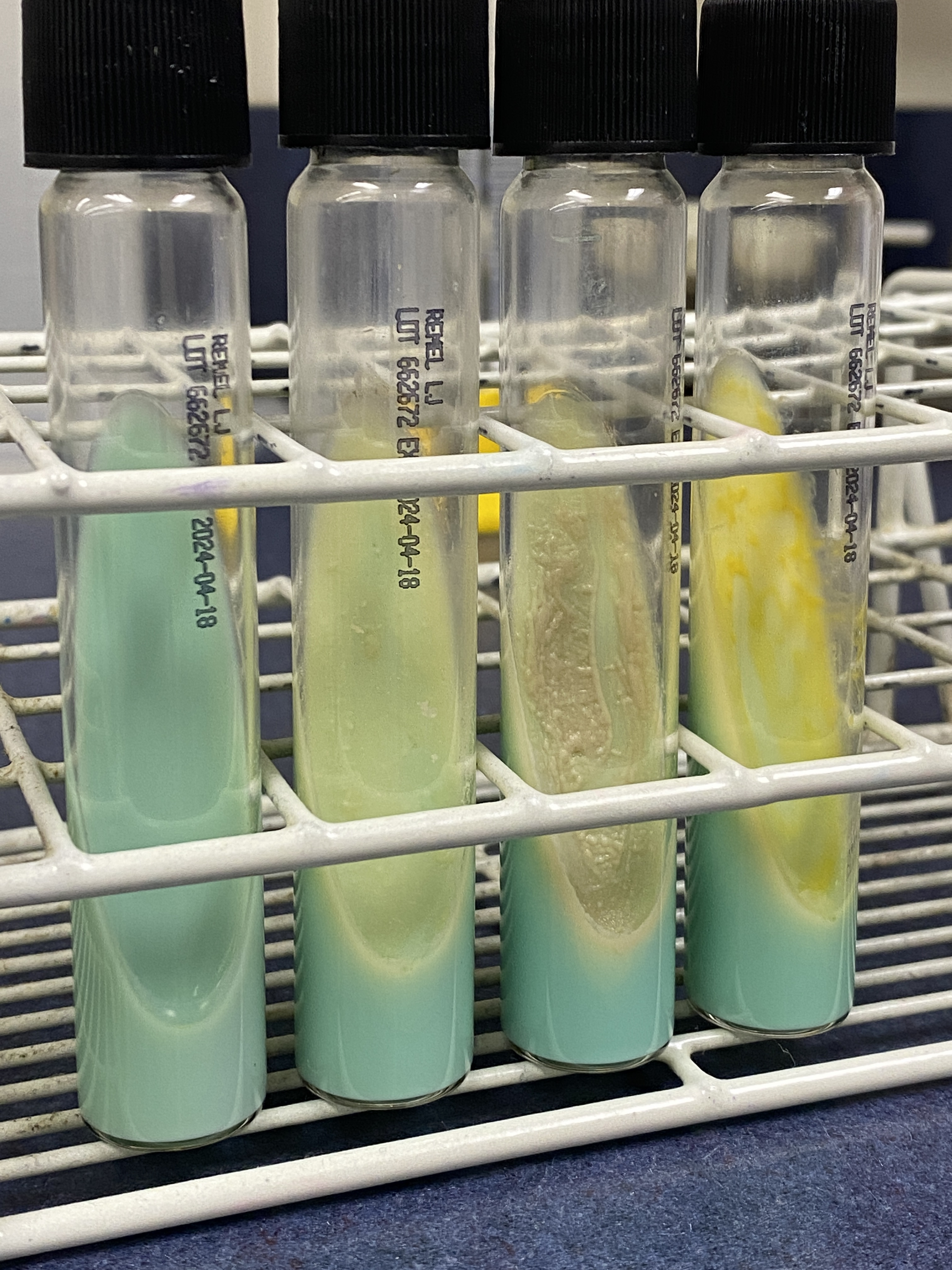
Slant tubes of Löwenstein-Jensen medium (Note: From left to right in image of slant tubes of Löwenstein-Jensen medium: – Negative control – M. tuberculosis: Dry-appearing colonies – Mycobacterium avium complex: Wet-appearing colonies – M. gordonae: Yellowish colonies)

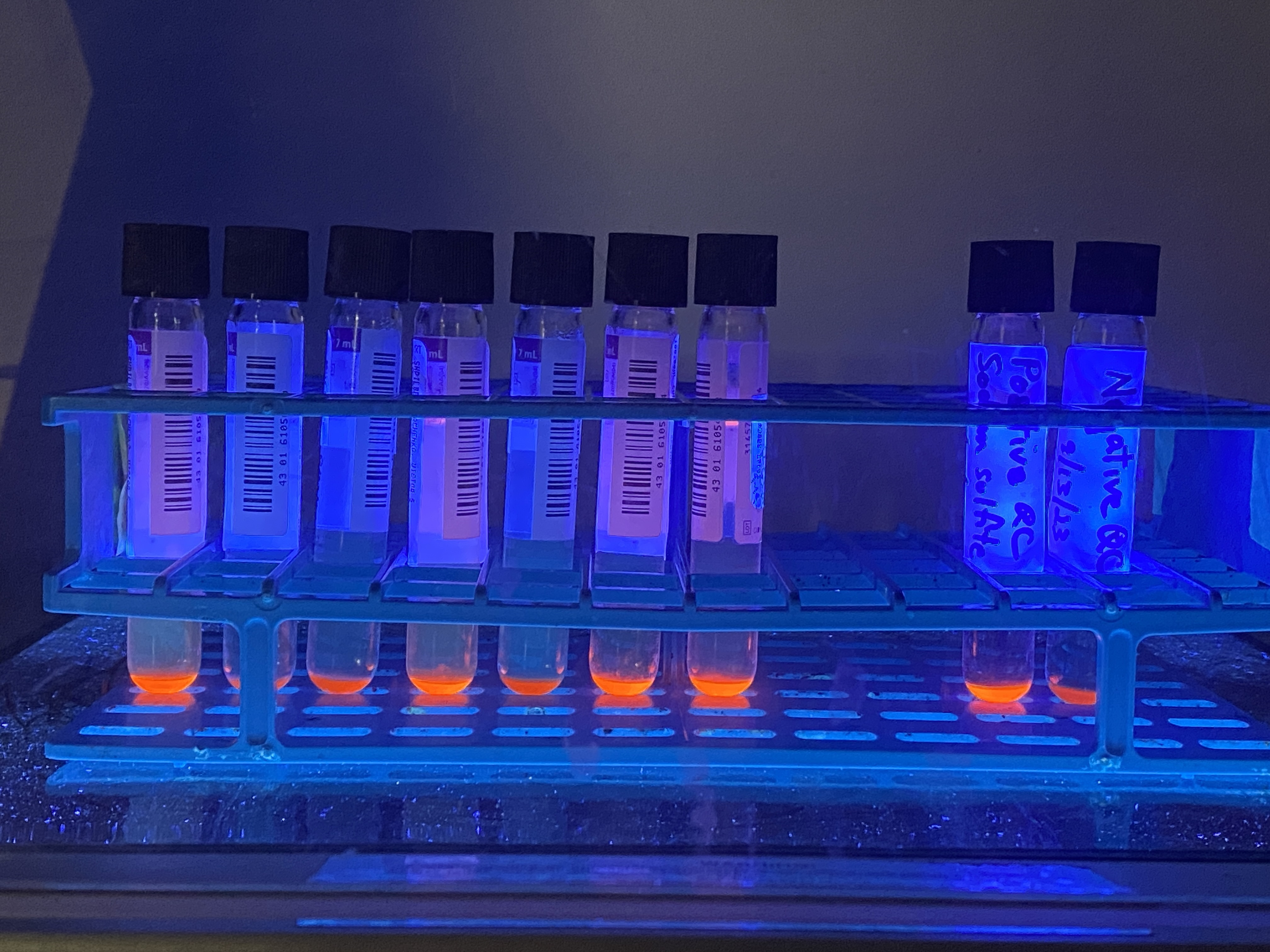
MGIT samples emitting fluorescence in ultraviolet light

== Mycobacteriophages ==
Mycobacteria can be infected by mycobacteriophages, a class of viruses with high specificity for their targets. By hijacking the cellular machinery of mycobacteria to produce additional phages, such viruses can be used in phage therapy. Phage therapy can provide an alternate solution to antibiotics, especially in cases of multi drug resistant infections.

== Mycosides ==
Mycosides are glycolipids isolated from Mycobacterium species with Mycoside A found in photochromogenic strains, Mycoside B in bovine strains, and Mycoside C in avian strains. Different forms of Mycoside C have varying success as a receptor to inactivate mycobacteriophages. Replacement of the gene encoding mycocerosic acid synthase in M. bovis prevents formation of mycosides.
