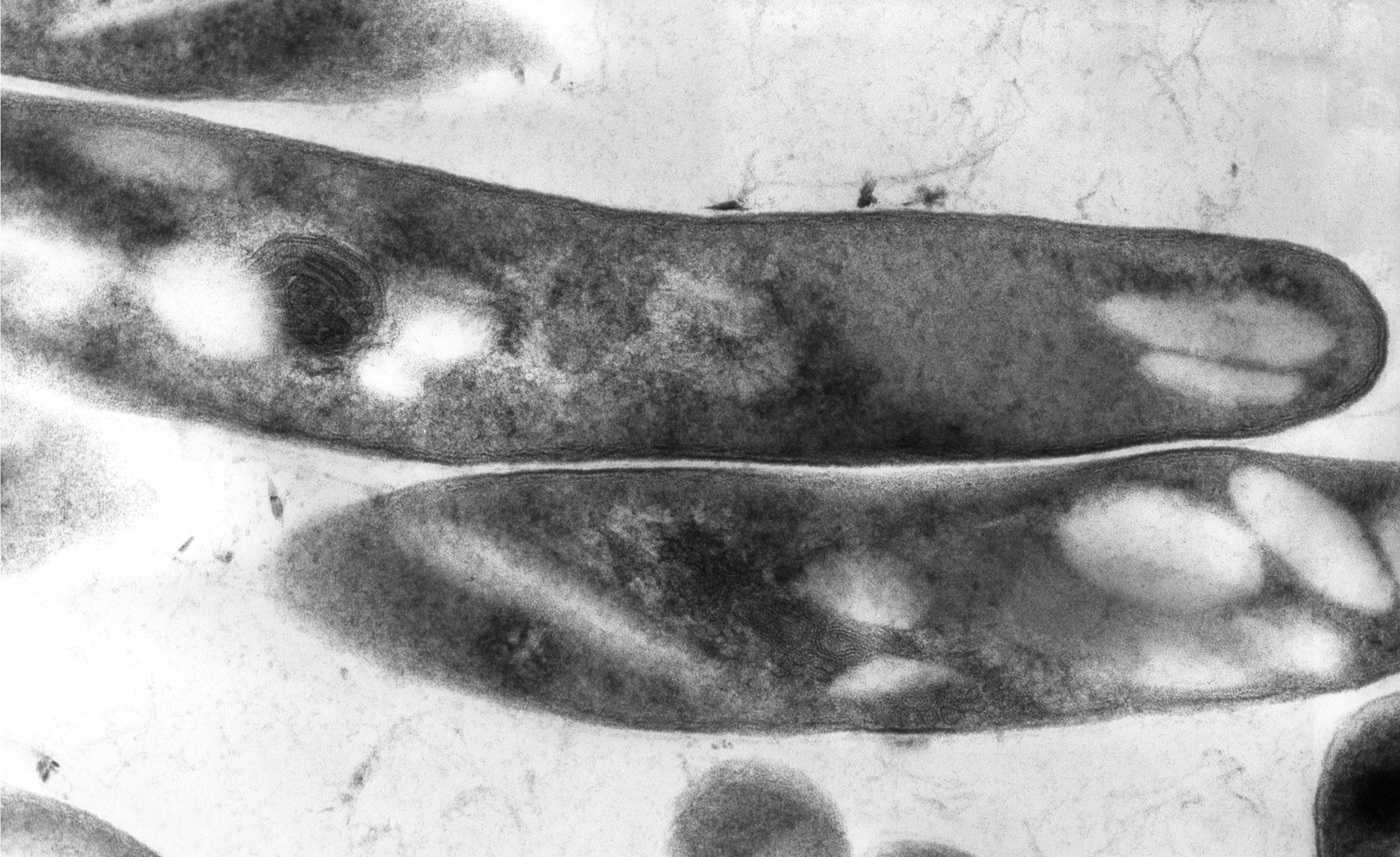

Scientific classification
- Domain: Bacteria
- Kingdom: Bacillati
- Phylum: Actinomycetota
- Class: Actinomycetes
- Order: Mycobacteriales
- Family: Mycobacteriaceae; Chester 1897 (Approved Lists 1980)

Genera.
- Bactoderma Tepper and Korshunova 1973 (Approved Lists 1980); Mycobacterium Lehmann and Neumann 1896 (Approved Lists 1980); Mycobacteroides Gupta et al. 2018; Mycolicibacillus Gupta et al. 2018; Mycolicibacter Gupta et al. 2018; Mycolicibacterium Gupta et al. 2018; Stibiobacter Lyalikova 1974 (Approved Lists 1980)

= Mycobacteriaceae =

Family of bacteria

Mycobacteriaceae is a family of bacteria in the phylum Actinomycetota. Its name is derived from the Mycobacterium genus, which includes pathogens known to cause serious diseases in mammals, including tuberculosis (M. tuberculosis) and leprosy (M. leprae) in humans. The Greek prefix myco- means 'fungus', alluding to the mold-like appearance of these organisms on agar plates.

== Phylogeny ==
The phylogeny is based on whole-genome analysis. (Note: Bactoderma and Stibiobacter are not included in this phylogenetic tree.)

- - Mycobacteriaceae
    - Mycobacteroides
    - - Mycolicibacterium
      - - - Mycolicibacter
          - Mycolicibacillus
        - Mycobacterium
  - Corynebacteriaceae (outgroup)
