= Slowly growing Mycobacteria =

Mycobacteria that form colonies clearly visible to the naked eye in more than 7 days on subculture are termed slow growers.

They can cause disease in humans.

== Nonchromogenic ==
=== Rough ===
- Mycobacterium africanum
- Mycobacterium bovis
- Mycobacterium leprae
- Mycobacterium lacus
- Mycobacterium lepraemurium
- Mycobacterium microti
- Mycobacterium pinnipedii
- Mycobacterium shottsii
- Mycobacterium tuberculosis

=== Smooth ===
- Mycobacterium branderi
- Mycobacterium heidelbergense
- Mycobacterium intracellulare
- Mycobacterium malmoense

=== Smooth to rough ===
- Mycobacterium gastri
- Mycobacterium haemophilum

=== Small and transparent ===
- Mycobacterium avium subsp. avium
- Mycobacterium avium subsp. paratuberculosis
- Mycobacterium avium subsp. silvaticum
- Mycobacterium genavense
- Mycobacterium montefiorense
- Mycobacterium ulcerans

== Photochromogenic ==
- Mycobacterium intermedium

Yellow and smooth

- Mycobacterium asiaticum
- Mycobacterium marinum

Yellow and rough

- Mycobacterium kansasii

== Scotochromogenic ==
=== Yellow ===
- Mycobacterium conspicuum
- Mycobacterium botniense
- Mycobacterium farcinogenes
- Mycobacterium heckeshornense
- Mycobacterium interjectum
- Mycobacterium kubicae
- Mycobacterium lentiflavum
- Mycobacterium nebraskense
- Mycobacterium palustre
- Mycobacterium tusciae

=== Yellow-orange ===
- Mycobacterium cookii
- Mycobacterium flavescens
- Mycobacterium gordonae

=== Rose-pink ===
- Mycobacterium hiberniae
