= Nontuberculous mycobacteria =

Some bacteria that do not cause tuberculosis

Nontuberculous mycobacteria (NTM), also known as environmental mycobacteria, atypical mycobacteria and mycobacteria other than tuberculosis (MOTT), are mycobacteria which do not cause tuberculosis or leprosy/Hansen's disease. They occur in many animals, including humans, and are commonly found in soil and water. NTM can cause pulmonary diseases that resemble tuberculosis. Mycobacteriosis is any of these illnesses, usually meant to exclude tuberculosis.

== Introduction ==
Mycobacteria are a family of small, rod-shaped bacilli that can be classified into three main groups for diagnosis and treatment:

- Mycobacterium tuberculosis complex, which can cause tuberculosis: M. tuberculosis, M. bovis, M. africanum, M. microti and M. canettii
- M. leprae and M. lepromatosis, which cause Hansen's disease, also called leprosy
- Nontuberculous mycobacteria (NTM) are all the other mycobacteria that can cause pulmonary disease resembling tuberculosis, lymphadenitis, skin disease, or disseminated disease. Although over 150 different species of NTM have been described, pulmonary infections are most commonly due to Mycobacterium avium complex (MAC), Mycobacterium kansasii, and Mycobacterium abscessus (see image).

== Taxonomy ==
In 1959, the botanist Ernest Runyon put these human disease-associated bacteria into four groups (Runyon classification):

- Photochromogens develop pigments in or after being exposed to light. Examples include M. kansasii, M. simiae, and M. marinum.
- Scotochromogens become pigmented in darkness. Examples include M. scrofulaceum and M. szulgai.
- Nonchromogens include a group of prevalent opportunistic pathogens called M. avium complex (MAC). Other examples are M. ulcerans, M. xenopi, M. malmoense, M. terrae, M. haemophilum, and M. genavense.
- Rapid growers include four well-recognized, pathogenic, rapidly growing, nonchromogenic species: M. chelonae, M. abscessus, M. fortuitum, and M. peregrinum. Other examples cause disease rarely, such as M. smegmatis and M. flavescens.

The number of identified and cataloged NTM species has been increasing rapidly, from about 50 in 1997 to over 125 by January 2007. The surge is mainly due to improved isolation and identification techniques.

Even with these new techniques, though, the Runyon classification is sometimes used to organize the mycobacteria into categories.

== Epidemiology ==
NTM are widely distributed in the environment, particularly in wet soil, marshland, streams, rivers, and estuaries. Different species of NTM prefer different types of environments. Human disease is believed to be acquired from environmental exposures. Unlike tuberculosis and leprosy, animal-to-human or human-to-human transmission of NTM rarely occurs.

NTM diseases have been seen in most industrialized countries, where incidence rates vary from 1.0 to 1.8 cases per 100,000 persons. Recent studies, including one done in Ontario, Canada, suggest that incidence is much higher. Pulmonary NTM is estimated by some experts in the field to be at least ten times more common than TB in the U.S., with at least 150,000 cases per year.

Most NTM disease cases involve the species known as Mycobacterium avium complex or MAC for short, M. abscessus, M. fortuitum and M. kansasii. M. abscessus is being seen with increasing frequency and is particularly difficult to treat.

Mayo Clinic researchers found a three-fold increased incidence of cutaneous NTM infection between 1980 and 2009 in a population-based study of residents of Olmsted County, Minnesota. The most common species were M. marinum, accounting for 45% of cases and M. chelonae and M. abscessus, together accounting for 32% of patients. M. chelonae infection outbreaks, as a consequence of tattooing with infected ink, have been reported in the United Kingdom and the United States.

Rapidly growing NTMs are implicated in catheter infections, post-LASIK, skin and soft tissue (especially post-cosmetic surgery), and pulmonary infections.

== Pathogenesis ==
The most common clinical manifestation of NTM disease is lung disease, but lymphatic, skin/soft tissue, and disseminated diseases are also important.

Pulmonary disease caused by NTM is most often seen in postmenopausal women and patients with underlying lung diseases such as cystic fibrosis, bronchiectasis, and prior tuberculosis. It is not uncommon for alpha 1-antitrypsin deficiency, Marfan syndrome, and primary ciliary dyskinesia patients to have pulmonary NTM colonization and/or infection. Pulmonary NTM can also be found in individuals with AIDS and malignant disease. It can be caused by many NTM species, which depends on region, but most frequently MAC and M. kansasii.

Clinical symptoms vary in scope and intensity but commonly include chronic cough, often with purulent sputum. Hemoptysis may also be present. Systemic symptoms include malaise, fatigue, and weight loss in advanced disease. The diagnosis of M. abscessus pulmonary infection requires the presence of symptoms, radiologic abnormalities, and microbiologic cultures.

Lymphadenitis can be caused by various species that differ from one place to another, but again, MAC is the main cause worldwide. Most patients are aged less than 5 years, but the incidence is rare for children having BCG vaccine. The disease has a high curability.

Soft-tissue disease due to NTM infection include post-traumatic abscesses (caused by rapid growers), swimming pool granuloma (caused by M. marinum) and Buruli ulcer (caused by M. ulcerans or M. shinshuense). Post-traumatic abscesses most commonly occur after injection.

Disseminated mycobacterial disease was common in US and European AIDS patients in the 1980s and early 1990s, though the incidence has declined in developed nations since the introduction of highly active antiretroviral therapy. It can also occur in individuals after having renal transplantation.

== Diagnosis ==
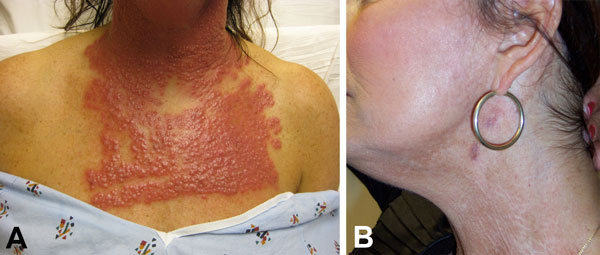
A) Neck and chest of a 53-year-old woman 14 days after fractionated CO_{2} laser resurfacing, showing nontuberculous mycobacterial infection B) Neck of the patient after five months of multidrug therapy and pulsed dye laser treatment.

Diagnosis of opportunistic mycobacteria is made by repeated isolation and identification of the pathogen with compatible clinical and radiological features. Similar to M. tuberculosis, most nontuberculous mycobacteria can be detected microscopically and grow on Löwenstein-Jensen medium. Many reference centres now use a nucleic acid-based method such as sequence differences detection in the gene coding for 16S ribosomal RNA to identify the species.

Pulmonary NTM disease diagnosis requires both identification of the mycobacterium in the patient's lung(s), as well as a high-resolution CT scan of the lungs.

== Research ==
French researchers finalized the genome sequence of M. abscessus in March 2008. The genome is available at https://www.ncbi.nlm.nih.gov/genome?cmd=search&term=abscessus.
