= Mycobacterium elephantis =

Scientific classification
- Domain: Bacteria
- Kingdom: Bacillati
- Phylum: Actinomycetota
- Class: Actinomycetes
- Order: Mycobacteriales
- Family: Mycobacteriaceae
- Genus: Mycobacterium
- Species: M. elephantis

Binomial name
- Mycobacterium elephantis Shojaei et al. 2000, DSM 44368

Species of bacterium

Mycobacterium elephantis, a bacterium of the family Mycobacteriaceae, was discovered and isolated from a deceased elephant near India and may be linked to respiratory dysfunction. Organisms in the genus Mycobacterium are known to be aerobic and non-motile. Organisms within Mycobacterium belong to either the rapid growing group (Organismal growth under seven days) or the slow growing group. M. elephantis is classified as a rapid grower and relates most closely to Mycobacterium confluentis and Mycobacterium phlei.

== Origin ==
Shojaei et al. discovered this bacterial species from a lung of a deceased elephant due to chronic respiratory disease in Sri Lanka, an island off the south end of India in the year 2000. A strain of the organism, 484^{t}, was isolated on Lõwenstein-Jensen medium by these researchers. L-J medium, Columbia blood, MacConkey agar, Middlebrook 7H10 agar, and 5% sodium chloride agar served as cultures for M. elephantis at varying temperatures for 3 to 10 days. No growth occurred on the 5% NaCl agar. This organism was found to be positive in a nitrate reduction test and negative in the aryl sulfatase test that were performed on this strain.

== Biology and biochemistry ==
=== Ecology ===
M. elephantis growth has been studied to find its preferred environmental factors. It is known to grow in the bronchial area of mammals, which rests at a pH of 5.5. The organism is host associated with mammals, suggested by the first isolation in the lung abscess of an elephant diagnosed with chronic respiratory disease in Sri Lanka. Most strains of this organism are found in sputum from the respiratory tract with strains found rarely in the lymph nodes.

=== Morphology ===
Through 16S rRNA gene sequencing, this Gram positive bacteria correlates to the Genus Mycobacterium; but high-performance liquid chromatography and PCR-restriction enzyme pattern analysis identifies a new species. Its phenotypic characteristics are in close relationship to M. flavescens. The phenotype shows a coccobacillary acid-fast organism when cultured in 12B broth and Löwenstein-Jensen solid medium. Yellow pigment and smooth dome shaped was the morphology of this species on L-J medium. On Middlebrooke 7H10 agar, strain DSM 44368 of Mycobacterium elephantis shows this previously stated morphology as well as another described as cream colored. With the onset of age, the yellow pigmentation ensues for DSM 44368. M. elephantis is also a non-motile species, as is a characteristic of the genus Mycobacterium.

=== Metabolism and physiology ===
Scarce results have been recorded to show the metabolic properties of M. elephantis, but there has been significant findings. After Shojaei et al. performed experiments testing properties of the 484^{t} strain, aerobic metabolic properties were found. M. elephantis is catalase, nitrate reductase, and urease positive as well as weakly acid alcohol fast. The 484^{t} strain was found to be negative for tellurite reduction as well as activity with aryl sulphatase. The optimal growth temperature for this species is about 42° Celsius with its first strains showing at the third day of growth at this temperature. Growth at lower temperatures around 30 °C occurs, but growth is minimal over 45 °C. Growth of this organism does not occur at temperatures above 52 °C. Although this organism is slower than average rapid growing Mycobacterium, growth under 7 days classifies this species as a rapid grower. Stunted growth is shown in the presence of isoniazid, rifampicin, and few other drugs.

=== Genome ===
Mycobacterium elephantis has been researched and studied to provide some insights on the genomic nature of this organism. A strain of M. elephantis, Lipa, contains a G-C content of 67.8%, and a genome size of 5.19 Mb. 250 pseudogenes are also found in this strain. The 484^{t} strain's (same as DSM 44368) 16S rRNA gene sequence as compared to other rapid growing mycobacterium showed a mean 96.7+ 0.5% similarity. It also showed a 96.2+ 0.4% similarity to slow growing mycobacteria. The closest neighbors that show the most similarity to M. elephantis are M. confluentis at 97.8% and M. phlei at 97.7%. Although closely related, strain 484^{t} shows 29 and 30 nucleotide differences in the familiar species.

== Significance ==
Mycobacterium elephantis has the potential to impact diagnostic evaluation when patients display untraceable tuberculosis symptoms. A patient in Asia was hospitalized due to chronic respiratory disease. A chest X-ray showed signs including a shadow in her right region of her chest, which is known to be a common sign of tuberculosis . Without physical evidence of tuberculosis by the absence of the species Mycobacterium tuberculosis, the physicians misdiagnosed her with tuberculosis; but the testing of the patient's bronchial lavage found coccobacillary, acid-fast microbes. After further testing, the isolate organism showed high similarity of up to 100% to Mycobacterium elephantis. This demonstrates the difficulty of diagnosing humans with tuberculosis in different geographic areas. Misdiagnosis can be a huge factor in patient care and rehabilitation, and further research on this organism can diminish this problem. Mycobacterium elephantis should not be ruled out in future diagnostics of chronic respiratory diseases.
