= Mycobacterium komossense =

Scientific classification
- Domain: Bacteria
- Kingdom: Bacillati
- Phylum: Actinomycetota
- Class: Actinomycetes
- Order: Mycobacteriales
- Family: Mycobacteriaceae
- Genus: Mycobacterium
- Species: M. komossense

Binomial name
- Mycobacterium komossense Kazda and Muller 1979, ATCC 33013

Species of bacterium

Mycobacterium komossense is a species of the phylum Actinomycetota (Gram-positive bacteria with high guanine and cytosine content, one of the dominant phyla of all bacteria), belonging to the genus Mycobacterium.

== Description ==
Gram-positive, nonmotile, short to moderately long and acid-fast rods.

Colony characteristics

- Eugonic, smooth, glistening and yellow-beige pigmented colonies. On Middlebrook 7H10 agar 0.5-2mm in diameter with entire margins.

Physiology

- Growth on Löwenstein-Jensen media and Middlebrook 7H10 agar at temperatures between 22 °C-37 °C in less than 7 days.
- Optimal growth at 31 °C, no growth at 45 °C.

Differential characteristics

- Uniqueness of species supported by antigenic analysis (immunodiffusion) and specific lipid patterns.
- A numerical taxonomy comparison showed close relationship to Mycobacterium aichiense.

== Pathogenesis ==
- Not known to be pathogenic in animals or humans.
- Biosafety level 1

== Type strain ==
- First isolated from intact sphagnum vegetation in the Komosse sphagnum bog in southern Sweden and Atlantic coastal area of Norway.

Strain Ko 2 = ATCC 33013 = CIP 105293 = DSM 44078 = HAMBI 2279 = HAMBI 2280 = JCM 12408.
