= Piscine tuberculosis =

Bacterial disease of fish

Piscine tuberculosis (piscine mycobacteriosis or fish tuberculosis) is a chronic infectious disease that afflicts many species of fish. This disease is caused by bacteria from the genus Mycobacterium and can afflict marine, brackish, and freshwater fish. Piscine mycobacteriosis has been known to affect over 200 species of fish and is a major cause of mortality in ornamental and farmed fish.

== Cause ==
Piscine mycobacteriosis is caused by acid-fast bacilli colloquially referred to as nontuberculous mycobacteria (NTM). These are pleomorphic Gram-positive bacteria found ubiquitously in the environment. The most common causes of piscine mycobacteriosis are M. marinum, M. chelonae, and M. fortuitum.

== Disease ==
Piscine tuberculosis is a common disease in fish and has been reported in aquaria, laboratories, commercial fish farms, and wild populations. It is considered to be a major cause of morbidity and mortality in fish.

=== Signs and symptoms ===
Piscine mycobacteriosis often presents as a chronic disease, with affected fish surviving for several weeks to years. Signs are variable and nonspecific; they can include emaciation, ascites, skin ulceration, hemorrhages, paleness, and skeletal deformities. Granulomatous inflammation may be found throughout internal organs and muscles and all tissues of the fish may be involved.

=== Transmission ===
Fish can acquire mycobacteria through the ingestion of contaminated feed or of infected dead fish. Transmission can also occur through contact with affected lesions or through the gills.

=== Diagnosis ===
A presumptive diagnosis can be made upon the visualization of acid-fast bacilli within granulomatous material from lesions. Sensitivity for acid-fast staining is low, granulomas containing no visible acid-fast bacilli are reported in many experimentally infected species of fish.

A definitive diagnosis requires the isolation and identification of the bacteria. Culture involves inoculating tissue samples onto Middlebrook 7H10, Lowenstein-Jensen, or another form of laboratory media. Culture-based detection of Mycobacterium spp. is complicated by the presence of bacterial flora that compete with Mycobacterium on standard laboratory media. The isolation of Mycobacterium from feces, external surfaces, and whole viscera is questionable.

== Treatment and control ==
There is currently no widely accepted treatment for mycobacteriosis in fish. Treatment is infrequently attempted as it appears ineffective at eliminating Mycobacterium from affected colonies and is not practical in fish intended as food. Treating the fish with antibiotics has been reported to fail even when in vitro susceptibility is confirmed. Control of piscine mycobacteriosis may necessitate the destruction of all affected stocks and disinfection of tanks and plumbing.

The Ag85A DNA vaccine was shown to provide short term immunity in striped bass against M. marinum, but it was unsuccessful at achieving long-term immunity.

== See also ==
- Nocardiosis in fish
- Mycobacterium marinum
