= Mycobacterium parmense =

Scientific classification
- Domain: Bacteria
- Kingdom: Bacillati
- Phylum: Actinomycetota
- Class: Actinomycetia
- Order: Mycobacteriales
- Family: Mycobacteriaceae
- Genus: Mycobacterium
- Species: M. parmense

Binomial name
- Mycobacterium parmense Fanti, et al. 2004

Species of bacterium

Mycobacterium parmense is a species of Mycobacterium.

It is closely related to Mycobacterium heidelbergense.

It is also closely related to Mycobacterium lentiflavum and Mycobacterium simiae.
