= Mycobacterium fallax =

Scientific classification
- Domain: Bacteria
- Kingdom: Bacillati
- Phylum: Actinomycetota
- Class: Actinomycetia
- Order: Mycobacteriales
- Family: Mycobacteriaceae
- Genus: Mycobacterium
- Species: M. fallax

Binomial name
- Mycobacterium fallax Lévy-Frébault, V. et al. 1983, ATCC 35219

Species of bacterium

Mycobacterium fallax is a species of the phylum Actinomycetota (Gram-positive bacteria with high guanine and cytosine content, one of the dominant phyla of all bacteria), belonging to the genus Mycobacterium.

== Description ==
Gram-positive, nonmotile and acid-fast rods (0.5 – 1 μm long) except for a small number (less than 20%) of cyanophil forms.

Colony characteristics

- Large, eugonic, buff coloured and rough colonies (Löwenstein-Jensen medium at 30 °C).
- Cauliflower-like morphology, resembling M. tuberculosis colonies. Cord formation at the edges of colonies (Middlebrook 7H10 agar at 30 °C).

Physiology

- Rapid growth at 30 °C, but not at 37 °C, on Löwenstein-Jensen or Middlebrook 7H10 media.
- Susceptible to ethambutol, rifampin and kanamycin.
- Resistant to isoniazid, pyrazinamide and streptomycin.

Differential characteristics

- Similarities to M. tuberculosis include colony morphology, thermolabile catalase, positive nitrate reductase; differences are negative reactions for niacin production and rapid growth at 30 °C.

== Pathogenesis ==
- Not known. Biosafety level 1.

== Type strain ==
- Isolated from environmental sources in France and the former Czechoslovakia. Strain ATCC 35219 = CCUG 37584 = CIP 81.39 = DSM 44179 = JCM 6405.
