= Mycobacterium wolinskyi =

Scientific classification
- Domain: Bacteria
- Kingdom: Bacillati
- Phylum: Actinomycetota
- Class: Actinomycetia
- Order: Mycobacteriales
- Family: Mycobacteriaceae
- Genus: Mycobacterium
- Species: M. wolinskyi

Binomial name
- Mycobacterium wolinskyi Brown et al. 1999, ATCC 700010

Species of bacterium

Mycobacterium wolinskyi is a rapidly growing mycobacterium most commonly seen in post-traumatic wound infections, especially those following open fractures and with associated osteomyelitis. Mycobacterium wolinskyi is clearly clinically significant, and occurs in the same settings as Mycobacterium smegmatis and members of the Mycobacterium fortuitum complex; they differ from members of the Mycobacterium fortuitum complex in the type of chronic lung disease they produce, with essentially all cases occurring in the setting of chronic lipoid pneumonia, either secondary to chronic oil ingestion or chronic aspiration (usually achalasia). Etymology: Wolinsky, named after Emanuel Wolinsky in honour of, and in recognition for, significant contributions to the study of the non-tuberculous mycobacteria.

- Mycobacterium wolinskyi was previously known as Mycobacterium smegmatis group 3.

== Description ==
Microscopy

- Gram-positive, nonmotile and acid-fast rods.

Colony characteristics

- Smooth to mucoid, off-white to cream coloured and nonpigmented colonies.
- Visible growth in 2 to 4 days on Middlebrook 7H10 agar.

Physiology

- No pigment is produced and growth occurs at 30, 35 and 45 °C.
- Isolates grow on MacConkey agar without crystal violet and in the presence of 5% NaCl, are negative for arylsulfatase activity at three days.
- Positive for iron uptake and nitrate reductase.
- They produce low-level semi-quantitative catalase activity that is stable at 68 °C, pH 7±0.
- The type strain is susceptible to amikacin and sulfamethoxazole, intermediately susceptible to doxycycline and ciprofloxacin, variably susceptible to cefmetazole, cefoxitin, chloramphenicol and clarithromycin, and resistant to isoniazid, rifampin and tobramycin.

== Pathogenesis ==
- M. wolinskyi causes human disease and is most commonly seen in post-traumatic wound infections, especially those following open fractures and with associated osteomyelitis.

== Type strain ==
- The type strain, ATCC 700010T (MO739), was recovered from a post-surgical facial abscess in Switzerland.
- Strain MO739 = ATCC 700010 = CCUG 47168 = CIP 106348 = DSM 44493 = JCM 13393.
