= Mycobacterium gastri =

Scientific classification
- Domain: Bacteria
- Kingdom: Bacillati
- Phylum: Actinomycetota
- Class: Actinomycetia
- Order: Mycobacteriales
- Family: Mycobacteriaceae
- Genus: Mycobacterium
- Species: M. gastri

Binomial name
- Mycobacterium gastri Wayne 1966, ATCC 15754

Species of bacterium

Mycobacterium gastri is a species of the phylum Actinomycetota (Gram-positive bacteria with high guanine and cytosine content, one of the dominant phyla of all bacteria), belonging to the genus Mycobacterium.

== Description ==
Moderately long to long, Gram-positive, aerobic, nonmotile and acid-fast rods.

Colony characteristics

- Nonchromogenic, smooth to rough, white colonies on Löwenstein-Jensen medium and smooth or somewhat granular on Middlebrook 7H10 agar.

Physiology

- Growth on Löwenstein-Jensen medium or on Middlebrook 7H10 agar at 37 °C, (temperature range 25 °C-40 °C), within 7 or more days.
- Does not grow in the presence of ethambutol or isoniazid.

Differential characteristics

- Closely related to M. kansasii
- M. gastri and M. kansasii share an identical 16S rDNA sequence. Species differentiation is possible by differences in the ITS and hsp65 sequences.
- M. kansasii produces a photochromogenic yellow pigment.
- AccuProbes for M. kansasii are negative.

== Pathogenesis ==
- Casual resident of human stomachs, but not considered a cause of disease.
- Biosafety level 1

== Type strain ==
- First isolated from human gastric specimen. Also found in soil.

Strain ATCC 15754 = CCUG 20995 = CIP 104530 = DSM 43505 = JCM 12407.
