= Mycobacterium phlei =

Scientific classification
- Domain: Bacteria
- Kingdom: Bacillati
- Phylum: Actinomycetota
- Class: Actinomycetia
- Order: Mycobacteriales
- Family: Mycobacteriaceae
- Genus: Mycobacterium
- Species: M. phlei

Binomial name
- Mycobacterium phlei Lehmann & Neumann 1899

Species of bacterium

Mycobacterium phlei is a species of acid-fast bacteria in the genus Mycobacterium. It is characterized as one of the fast-growing mycobacteria. M. phlei has only occasionally been isolated in human infections, and patients infected with M. phlei generally respond well to anti-mycobacterial therapy. M. phlei has an unusually high GC-content of 73%.

== Description ==
M. phlei is a rod-shaped bacterium 1.0 to 2.0 micrometers in length. If grown on an agar plate, M. phlei colonies appear orange to yellow in color, and predominantly dense with smooth edges, although some smaller filamentous colonies have also been described. Like other mycobacteria, M. phlei retains the acid-fast stain. M. phlei can grow at temperatures ranging from 28 °C to 52 °C.

== History ==
M. phlei was first identified as the "Timothy Bacillus" or "Grass Bacillus I" by the German microbiologist Alfred Moëller in 1898. The following year, the bacterium was given its current name by Karl Bernhard Lehmann and Rudolf Otto Neumann.

This bacterium was extensively studied by Brodie and collaborators, in connection with the metabolism and role of vitamin K2.
