= Mycobacterium conceptionense =

Scientific classification
- Domain: Bacteria
- Kingdom: Bacillati
- Phylum: Actinomycetota
- Class: Actinomycetes
- Order: Mycobacteriales
- Family: Mycobacteriaceae
- Genus: Mycobacterium
- Species: M. conceptionense

Binomial name
- Mycobacterium conceptionense Adékambi et al. 2006, CCUG 50187

Species of bacterium

Mycobacterium conceptionense is a non pigmented rapidly growing mycobacterium was first isolated from wound liquid outflow, bone tissue biopsy, and excised skin tissue from a 31-year-old woman who suffered an accidental open right tibia fracture and prolonged stay in a river. Etymology: conceptionense, pertaining to Hôpital de la Conception, the hospital where the first strain was isolated.

== Description ==
Microscopy

- Acid-fast and gram-positive bacilli.

Colony characteristics

- Colonies are non pigmented.

Physiology

- Colonies appear on 5% sheep blood agar, Middlebrook 7H10 agar, and egg-based Lowenstein-Jensen slants in 2 to 5

days at temperatures between 25 and 37 °C, optimally at 30 °C. No growth occurs at 42 °C.

- The type strain is susceptible in vitro to imipenem, minocycline, doxycycline, clarithromycin, erythromycin, azithromycin, amikacin, ciprofloxacin, ofloxacin, sparfloxacin, and amoxicillinclavulanate and resistant to penicillin, amoxicillin, and vancomycin.

Differential characteristics

- M. conceptionense shares 99.7% 16S rRNA (4-bp difference) and 97.0% rpoB gene sequence similarity with Mycobacterium porcinum, the nearest species.

== Pathogenesis ==
- This species is associated with post traumatic osteitis.

== Type strain ==
- Strain D16 = CCUG 50187 = CIP 108544
