= Mycobacterium duvalii =

Scientific classification
- Domain: Bacteria
- Kingdom: Bacillati
- Phylum: Actinomycetota
- Class: Actinomycetes
- Order: Mycobacteriales
- Family: Mycobacteriaceae
- Genus: Mycobacterium
- Species: M. duvalii

Binomial name
- Mycobacterium duvalii Stanford and Gunthorpe 1971, ATCC 51304

Species of bacterium

Mycobacterium duvalii is a species of the phylum Actinomycetota (Gram-positive bacteria with high guanine and cytosine content, one of the dominant phyla of all bacteria), belonging to the genus Mycobacterium.

== Description ==
Gram-positive, nonmotile and pleomorphic acid-fast rods.

Colony characteristics

- Bright yellow pigmented, scotochromogenic and rough or smooth colonies on Löwenstein–Jensen medium.

Physiology

- Fast growth on Löwenstein–Jensen medium at 25 °C and 37 °C within 7 days. No growth at 45 °C.
- Resistant to isoniazid, rifampicin, and sodium aminosalicylate.

Differential characteristics

- Characterised by the possession of 6 species-specific antigens demonstrable in immunodiffusion tests.

Pathogenicity.

== Pathogenesis ==
Not pathogenic, but evidence insufficient. Biosafety level 1.

== Type strain ==
First isolated from cases of human leprosy by C. W. Duval. Strain ATCC 43910 = CCUG 41352 = CIP 104539 = DSM 44244 = JCM 6396 = NCTC 358.
