= Mycobacterium boenickei =

Scientific classification
- Domain: Bacteria
- Kingdom: Bacillati
- Phylum: Actinomycetota
- Class: Actinomycetes
- Order: Mycobacteriales
- Family: Mycobacteriaceae
- Genus: Mycobacterium
- Species: M. boenickei

Binomial name
- Mycobacterium boenickei Schinsky et al. 2004, ATCC 49935

Species of bacterium

Mycobacterium boenickei is a member of the Mycobacterium fortuitum third biovariant complex. They are rapidly growing ubiquitous environmental organisms that normally inhabit soil, dust and water. These organisms frequently are human pathogens that cause a wide spectrum of clinically significant disease. It is important for practitioners to be aware of these organisms as possible etiological agents, as they are resistant to most first-line anti-tuberculous agents.

- Etymology: boenickei, of Bönicke, in honour of the contribution of Rudolf Bönicke, a German mycobacteriologist, who first recognized the heterogeneity within the Mycobacterium fortuitum complex.

== Description ==
Microscopy

- The organisms are acid-fast, Gram-positive, pleomorphic bacilli. Long filamentous forms are often observed, but spores and capsules are absent.

Colony characteristics

- Colonies are matt, domed, scalloped-edged and do not demonstrate aerial hyphae.
- On heart infusion agar with 5% (v/v) rabbit blood for 2 days at 35 °C. shows white to slightly beige, small-diameter (approx. 1 mm) colonies.

Physiology

- Growth occurs on Löwenstein–Jensen medium at 35 °C in less than 7 days, but no growth occurs at 42 °C
- Growth occurs on 5% NaCl and on MacConkey's agar without crystal violet at 28 °C
- None of the isolates grow in lysozyme or utilize citrate, and five of six (83%) isolates produce arylsulfatase in 3 days.
- The semi-quantitative catalase activity of all isolates is reactive (>45 mm).

Differential characteristics

- The nearest phylogenetic neighbours, according to 16S rRNA gene sequence similarity, are M. neworleansense and all M. porcinum isolates studied (all 99·9%).

== Pathogenesis ==
- Reported infections include skin and soft-tissue abscesses with associated osteomyelitis, bacteraemia, endocarditis, keratitis, lymphadenitis, peritonitis, post-surgical infections, pulmonary infections and disseminated disease. Involvement of the central nervous system is rare, but meningitis may develop after trauma or surgery. The immunocompromised patient is at special risk for developing severe diseases, especially catheter-related infection with bacteraemia.

== Type strain ==
- Type strain: strain W5998 = ATCC 49935 = DSM 44677.
- The type strain, was first isolated from a leg wound
