= Mycobacterium cookii =

Scientific classification
- Domain: Bacteria
- Kingdom: Bacillati
- Phylum: Actinomycetota
- Class: Actinomycetia
- Order: Mycobacteriales
- Family: Mycobacteriaceae
- Genus: Mycobacterium
- Species: M. cookii

Binomial name
- Mycobacterium cookii Kazda et al. 1990, ATCC 51304

Species of bacterium

Mycobacterium cookii is a species of the phylum Actinomycetota (Gram-positive bacteria with high guanine and cytosine content, one of the dominant phyla of all bacteria), belonging to the genus Mycobacterium.

== Description ==
Gram-positive, nonmotile and polymorphic acid-fast rods (0.8 μm x 1.4–1.9 μm). Forms clumps, but not cords or cross bands. Does not form spores, capsules and aerial hyphae.

Colony characteristics

- Colonies are smooth and glistening with yellow-orange pigmentation (0.5–1.0 mm diameter, scotochromogenic).

Physiology

- Slow growth on Löwenstein-Jensen medium or Middlebrook 7H10 agar at 31 °C (optimal temperature). No growth at 37 °C, 42 °C or 45 °C.
- Most of the strains are susceptible to ethambutol, isoniazid, streptomycin, and rifampin.

Differential characteristics

- Phylogenetic position between the slowly growing pathogenic species and the saprotrophic rapidly growing species by partial 16S rDNA sequencing.

== Pathogenesis ==
- Not pathogenic for humans, mice, guinea pigs and rabbits. Biosafety level 1.
- Provokes a non-specific hypersensitivity reaction to bovine tuberculin.

== Type strain ==
Strain NZ2 = ATCC 49103 = CIP 105396 = DSM 43922 = JCM 12404.
