= Mycobacterium houstonense =

Scientific classification
- Domain: Bacteria
- Kingdom: Bacillati
- Phylum: Actinomycetota
- Class: Actinomycetia
- Order: Mycobacteriales
- Family: Mycobacteriaceae
- Genus: Mycobacterium
- Species: M. houstonense

Binomial name
- Mycobacterium houstonense Schinsky et al., 2004

Type strain
- ATCC 49403

Species of bacterium

Mycobacterium houstonense is a member of the Mycobacterium fortuitum third biovariant complex. The specific epithet houstonense refers to Houston, Texas, where the first isolate of the M. fortuitum third biovariant (sorbitol-positive) was identified.
