= Mycobacterium saskatchewanense =

Scientific classification
- Domain: Bacteria
- Kingdom: Bacillati
- Phylum: Actinomycetota
- Class: Actinomycetia
- Order: Mycobacteriales
- Family: Mycobacteriaceae
- Genus: Mycobacterium
- Species: M. saskatchewanense

Binomial name
- Mycobacterium saskatchewanense Lehmann and Neumann 1896 (Approved Lists 1980)

Species of bacterium

Mycobacterium saskatchewanense is a species of Mycobacterium.

It is closely related to Mycobacterium interjectum.
