= Mycobacterium botniense =

Scientific classification
- Domain: Bacteria
- Kingdom: Bacillati
- Phylum: Actinomycetota
- Class: Actinomycetia
- Order: Mycobacteriales
- Family: Mycobacteriaceae
- Genus: Mycobacterium
- Species: M. botniense

Binomial name
- Mycobacterium botniense Torkko et al. 2000, ATCC 700701

Species of bacterium

Mycobacterium botniense is a slowly growing Mycobacterium, which produces a yellow pigment. It was first isolated from a stream of water. M. botniense is most closely related to Mycobacterium xenopi. Etymology: botniense; of Botnia, referring to the Latin name of the province of Finland from which the isolation was made.

== Description ==
Microscopy

- Gram-positive, nonmotile and acid-fast rods.

Colony characteristics

- Colonies on Löwenstein-Jensen media and on Middlebrook 7H11 agar are small, dysgonic and scotochromogenic, and produce yellow pigment.

Physiology

- Visible growth from diluted inocula requires 5 to 8 weeks. Growth occurs at 37 to 50 °C.
- The type strain is positive for 10-d arylsulfatase and pyrazinamidase.
- Negative for 3-d arylsulfatase, urease, nitrate reductase, semi-quantitative catalase, heat-stable catalase, acid phosphatase, b-galactosidase and 5% NaCl tolerance.
- Tween 80 is not hydrolysed in 10 d.

Differential characteristics

- A phylogenetic tree based on the evaluation of 16S rDNA sequences places M. botniense among the slow-growing mycobacteria, closest to M. xenopi.

== Pathogenesis ==
- Not known, but first isolated from an environmental source.

== Type strain ==
- First isolated in Finland from stream waters. Strain E347 = ATCC 700701 = CCUG 47976 = CIP 106753 = DSM 44537.
