= Mycobacterium conspicuum =

Scientific classification
- Domain: Bacteria
- Kingdom: Bacillati
- Phylum: Actinomycetota
- Class: Actinomycetes
- Order: Mycobacteriales
- Family: Mycobacteriaceae
- Genus: Mycobacterium
- Species: M. conspicuum

Binomial name
- Mycobacterium conspicuum Springer et al. 1996, ATCC 700090

Species of bacterium

Mycobacterium conspicuum is a species of the phylum Actinomycetota (Gram-positive bacteria with high guanine and cytosine content, one of the dominant phyla of all bacteria), belonging to the genus Mycobacterium.

== Description ==
Gram-positive and nonmotile acid-fast coccobacilli. Does not form spores, capsules or aerial hyphae.

Colony characteristics

- Dysgonic and nonphotochromogenic, pale yellow colonies on Löwenstein-Jensen agar.

Physiology

- Slow growth on Löwenstein-Jensen medium at temperatures between 22 and 31 °C (72 and 88 °F) after 2–3 weeks.
- Susceptible to ethambutol, rifampin, streptomycin, resistant to pyrazinamide.
- Synthesis of α- and keto-mycolates and wax esters.
- no tolerance to 5% NaCl, positive for Tween 80 hydrolysis and for 10-day-arylsulfatase. Negative for production of nicotinic acid, acetamidase, benzamidase, urease, isonicotinamidase, nicotinamidase, pyrazinamidase, succinidamidase, nitrate reductase and tellurite reduction.

== Pathogenesis ==
Opportunistic pathogen, disseminated mycobacteriosis, Biosafety level 2.

== Type Strain ==
First isolated from two male HIV infected patients in Germany. Strain 3895/92 = ATCC 700090 = CIP 105165 = DSM 44136.
