= Mycobacterium kubicae =

Scientific classification
- Domain: Bacteria
- Kingdom: Bacillati
- Phylum: Actinomycetota
- Class: Actinomycetia
- Order: Mycobacteriales
- Family: Mycobacteriaceae
- Genus: Mycobacterium
- Species: M. kubicae

Binomial name
- Mycobacterium kubicae Floyd et al. 2000, ATCC 700732

Species of bacterium

Mycobacterium kubicae is a Gram-positive, nonmotile and acid-fast bacterial species. Cells are typically rod-shaped, with some coccoid forms. Colonies of M. kubicae on solid media (specifically Middlebrook 7H11 agar) are generally smooth and domed, with a yellow scotochromogenic pigment. On Löwenstein-Jensen media they appear film-like. This species is not known to be pathogenic to humans. The species is named after American mycobacteriologist George Kubica.

== Physiology ==
M. kubicae requires 21 days of incubation between 33 °C and 37 °C to reach mature growth. Isolates have been shown to be resistant to the antibiotics amikacin and rifampin and partially resistant to ciprofloxacin, cycloserine, ethambutol, isoniazid, rifabutin and streptomycin. Susceptibility to clarithromycin, clofazimine and ethionamide has been detected for some strains.

== Type strain ==
The type strain of M. kubicae, ATCC 700732, was isolated from human sputum. The strain may also be identified as CDC 941078, CIP 106428, DSM 44627, or JCM 13573.
