= Mycobacterium confluentis =

Scientific classification
- Domain: Bacteria
- Kingdom: Bacillati
- Phylum: Actinomycetota
- Class: Actinomycetes
- Order: Mycobacteriales
- Family: Mycobacteriaceae
- Genus: Mycobacterium
- Species: M. confluentis

Binomial name
- Mycobacterium confluentis Kirschner et al. 1992, ATCC 49920

Species of bacterium

Mycobacterium confluentis is a non-pathogenic bacterium of the oral cavity.

== Description ==
Gram-positive, nonmotile, acid-fast coccobacillus (0.5-0.8 μm x 0.7-1.7 μm), does not form spores, capsules or aerial hyphae.

== Physiology ==
- Rapid growth within 2 to 4 days on Löwenstein-Jensen media at 22 °C, 31 °C, 37 °C and 41 °C (optimum growth between 31 °C and 37 °C).
- In vitro susceptibility to isoniazid, ethambutol and streptomycin.

== Differential characteristics ==
- Differentiation from other thermotolerant mycobacteria by its inability to grow at temperatures of more than 41 °C.
- Separation from other rapidly growing mycobacteria by its susceptibility to antituberculotic drugs.
- Differentiated from the phenotypic closely related M. thermoresistibile by its inability to grow at 52 °C.

== Pathogenesis ==
Not associated with disease. Biosafety level 1.

== Type strain ==
First isolated from sputum, Koblenz, Germany. strain 1389/90 = ATCC 49920 = CIP 105510 = DSM 44017 = JCM 13671.
