= Mycobacterium moriokaense =

Scientific classification
- Domain: Bacteria
- Kingdom: Bacillati
- Phylum: Actinomycetota
- Class: Actinomycetia
- Order: Mycobacteriales
- Family: Mycobacteriaceae
- Genus: Mycobacterium
- Species: M. moriokaense

Binomial name
- Mycobacterium moriokaense Tsukamura et al. 1986, ATCC 43059

Species of bacterium

Mycobacterium moriokaense
Etymology: moriokaense, from Morioka, Japan where the organism was first isolated.

== Description ==
Gram-positive, nonmotile and acid-fast rods (2-6 μm x 0.5 μm).

Colony characteristics

- Dry, rough and nonpigmented (nonphotochromogenic) colonies.

Physiology

- Rapid growth on Löwenstein-Jensen media at 28 °C, 37 °C and 42 °C, but not at 45 °C within 3 days.

== Pathogenesis ==
- Biosafety level 1

== Type strain ==
- First isolated from sputum of a patient with tuberculosis and from soil in Morioka, Japan.

Strain NCH E11715 = ATCC 43059 = CCUG 37671 = CIP 105393 = DSM 44221 = JCM 6375 = VKM Ac-1183.
