= Mycobacterium intermedium =

Scientific classification
- Domain: Bacteria
- Kingdom: Bacillati
- Phylum: Actinomycetota
- Class: Actinomycetia
- Order: Mycobacteriales
- Family: Mycobacteriaceae
- Genus: Mycobacterium
- Species: M. intermedium

Binomial name
- Mycobacterium intermedium Meier et al. 1993, ATCC 51848

Species of bacterium

Mycobacterium intermedium is a species of the phylum Actinomycetota (Gram-positive bacteria with high guanine and cytosine content, one of the dominant phyla of all bacteria), belonging to the genus Mycobacterium.

Etymology: Latin; intermedium, meaning between, rapidly and slowly growing mycobacteria.

== Description ==
Gram-positive, and nonmotile acid-fast coccobacilli (2.0 μm x 2.6 μm).

Colony characteristics

- Eugonic, smooth and photochromogenic colonies (3–5mm in diameter) on Löwenstein-Jensen medium.

Physiology

- Growth on Löwenstein-Jensen medium at 22 °C, 31 °C, 37 °C and 41 °C, (optimal temperature between 31 °C and 37 °C), within 2–3 weeks.
- Susceptible to ethambutol and rifampin.
- Resistant to isoniazid and streptomycin.

Differential characteristics

- Phylogenetic position between rapidly and slowly growing mycobacteria.
- M. asiaticum is phenotypically very similar, but can be distinguished by its growth at 22 °C, and by its dysgonic growth.

== Pathogenesis ==
- Pulmonary disease
- Biosafety level 2

== Type strain ==
- Repeatedly isolated from sputum from a patient with pulmonary disease.

Strain 1669/91 = ATCC 51848 = CCUG 37583 = CIP 104542 = DSM 44049 = JCM 13572
