= Mycobacterium lacus =

Scientific classification
- Domain: Bacteria
- Kingdom: Bacillati
- Phylum: Actinomycetota
- Class: Actinomycetes
- Order: Mycobacteriales
- Family: Mycobacteriaceae
- Genus: Mycobacterium
- Species: M. lacus

Binomial name
- Mycobacterium lacus Turenne et al. 2002, ATCC BAA-323

Species of bacterium

Mycobacterium lacus is a species of bacteria in the genus Mycobacterium known to be a causative agent in immunocompetent individuals.

== Description ==
Large, dispersed acid-fast bacilli with prominent beading

Colony characteristics

- Colonies on Löwenstein–Jensen medium were nonchromogenic, small, with a dry appearance.
- On Middlebrook 7H10 agar, colonies are small, non-pigmented and smooth to rough, with a slightly irregular edge. Younger colonies appeared slightly transparent.

=== Physiology ===
- Growth was observed on Löwenstein–Jensen medium at two weeks at both 37 and 42 °C and at 3 weeks at 30 °C. At four weeks, very little growth was observed at 25 °C, and no growth was observed at 52 °C.

== Pathogenesis ==
- The causative agent of bursitis in an immunocompetent individual.

== Type strain ==
- Isolated from synovial tissue from a 68-year-old female with bursitis of her right elbow. The likely exposure was in a lake.

Strain NRCM 00-255 = ATCC BAA-323 = DSM 44577
