= Mycobacterium neworleansense =

Scientific classification
- Domain: Bacteria
- Kingdom: Bacillati
- Phylum: Actinomycetota
- Class: Actinomycetia
- Order: Mycobacteriales
- Family: Mycobacteriaceae
- Genus: Mycobacterium
- Species: M. neworleansense

Binomial name
- Mycobacterium neworleansense Schinsky et al. 2004, ATCC 49403

Species of bacterium

Mycobacterium neworleansense is a member of the Mycobacterium fortuitum third biovariant complex.
