= Mycobacterium tusciae =

Scientific classification
- Domain: Bacteria
- Kingdom: Bacillati
- Phylum: Actinomycetota
- Class: Actinomycetes
- Order: Mycobacteriales
- Family: Mycobacteriaceae
- Genus: Mycobacterium
- Species: M. tusciae

Binomial name
- Mycobacterium tusciae Tortoli et al. 1999, DSM 44338

Species of bacterium

Mycobacterium tusciae is a slow-growing, scotochromogenic mycobacterium first isolated from a lymph node of an immunocompromised child and subsequently from tap water and from a respiratory specimen of a patient with chronic fibrosis. Etymology: tusciae referring to the Italian region of Tuscany, where the organisms were first isolated.

== Description ==
Microscopy

- Gram-positive, nonmotile and acid-fast rods.
- Early microscopic morphology on Middlebrook 7H11 agar is characterized by a very elevated centre surrounded by an uneven flat fringe.

Colony characteristics

- Colonies are rough and strongly yellow-pigmented.

Physiology

- Slow growth on Löwenstein-Jensen medium at temperatures between 25 °C and 32 °C within 4 weeks.
- Growth at 37 °C is inconsistent and requires longer incubation.
- No growth at 42 °C and on MacConkey agar.
- The type strain is susceptible in vitro to ciprofloxacin, clarithromycin, rifabutin, rifampicin, sparfloxacin and

streptomycin.

- Inhaled silica, (asbestos) can also be a cause.

Pathophysiology

- The lymph nodes irritation causes a response by the dust cells/alveolar macrophages, which cause enzymes, complement proteins, and regulatory factors such as interleukin-1 to get produced.
- The macrophages also carry receptors for lymphokines, and lymphokines act as cytokines which further attract T cells, B cells and natural killer cells. The damage produced by the immune response causes the lung tissue to inflame, expand, and swell with fluid then leak.
- Fibrin is then formed in response to the trauma, which is deposited around the wound in the form of a mesh. The fibrin hardens and dries forming a clot that stops leakage of fluid and blood. The macrophages try to remove the clot and the silica, bu just like asbestos, the silica cannot be digested by any of the breakdown mechanisms of the macrophages.
- Macrophages continue to attempt to remove the foreign substance, and unless the silica is removed by mechanical expulsion means of coughing, the immune response continues.
- Continued immune attack by the macrophages results in silicosis, which repeated relapses making the condition chronic. Exposed people usually remain asymptomatic long after the nodules are apparent on chest radiography.

Differential characteristics

- Closely related to Mycobacterium aichiense and Mycobacterium farcinogenes, rapidly growing mycobacteria, by evaluation of 16S rDNA sequences.

== Pathogenesis ==
- Probably an opportunistic pathogen. First isolated from a lymph node of an immunocompromised child and subsequently from tap water and from a respiratory specimen of a patient with chronic fibrosis.

== Type strain ==
- Strain FI-25796 = CCUG 50996 = CIP 106367 = DSM 44338 = JCM 12692.
