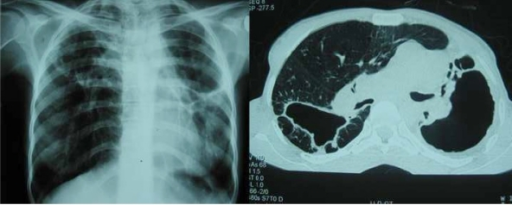
- Fibrothorax caused by infection with M lentiflavum.

Scientific classification
- Domain: Bacteria
- Kingdom: Bacillati
- Phylum: Actinomycetota
- Class: Actinomycetia
- Order: Mycobacteriales
- Family: Mycobacteriaceae
- Genus: Mycobacterium
- Species: M. lentiflavum

Binomial name
- Mycobacterium lentiflavum Springer et al. 1996, ATCC 51985

= Mycobacterium lentiflavum =

Species of bacterium

Mycobacterium lentiflavum
Etymology: Lentus from Latin for slow, flavus, Latin for yellow.

== Description ==
Gram-positive, nonmotile and acid-fast coccobacilli.

Colony characteristics

- Smooth colonies, with bright yellow pigmentation 1-2mm in diameter.

Physiology

- Slow growth on Löwenstein-Jensen medium at temperatures between 22 °C and 37 °C within 3–4 weeks.
- Generally resistant to isoniazid, rifampin, ethambutol and streptomycin.

Differential characteristics

- Phylogenetic analysis, based on an evaluation of 16S rDNA sequences, places M. lentiflavum in an intermediate position between rapidly and slowly growing mycobacteria, closely related to Mycobacterium simiae and Mycobacterium genavense.

== Pathogenesis ==
- In young children with cervical lymphadenitis and in immunocompromised patients
- One case of vertebral osteomyelitis reported
- Biosafety level 2

== Type strain ==
- First isolated from a patient with spondylodiscitis (vertebral osteomyelitis). Further isolates from clinical specimens were obtained due to the use of contaminated bronchoscopes. Also recovered from gastric juice, sputum and urine samples.

Strain 2186/92 = ATCC 51985 = CCUG 42422 = CCUG 42559 = CIP 105465 = DSM 44418 = JCM 13390.
