= Anna Strohsahl =

German politician

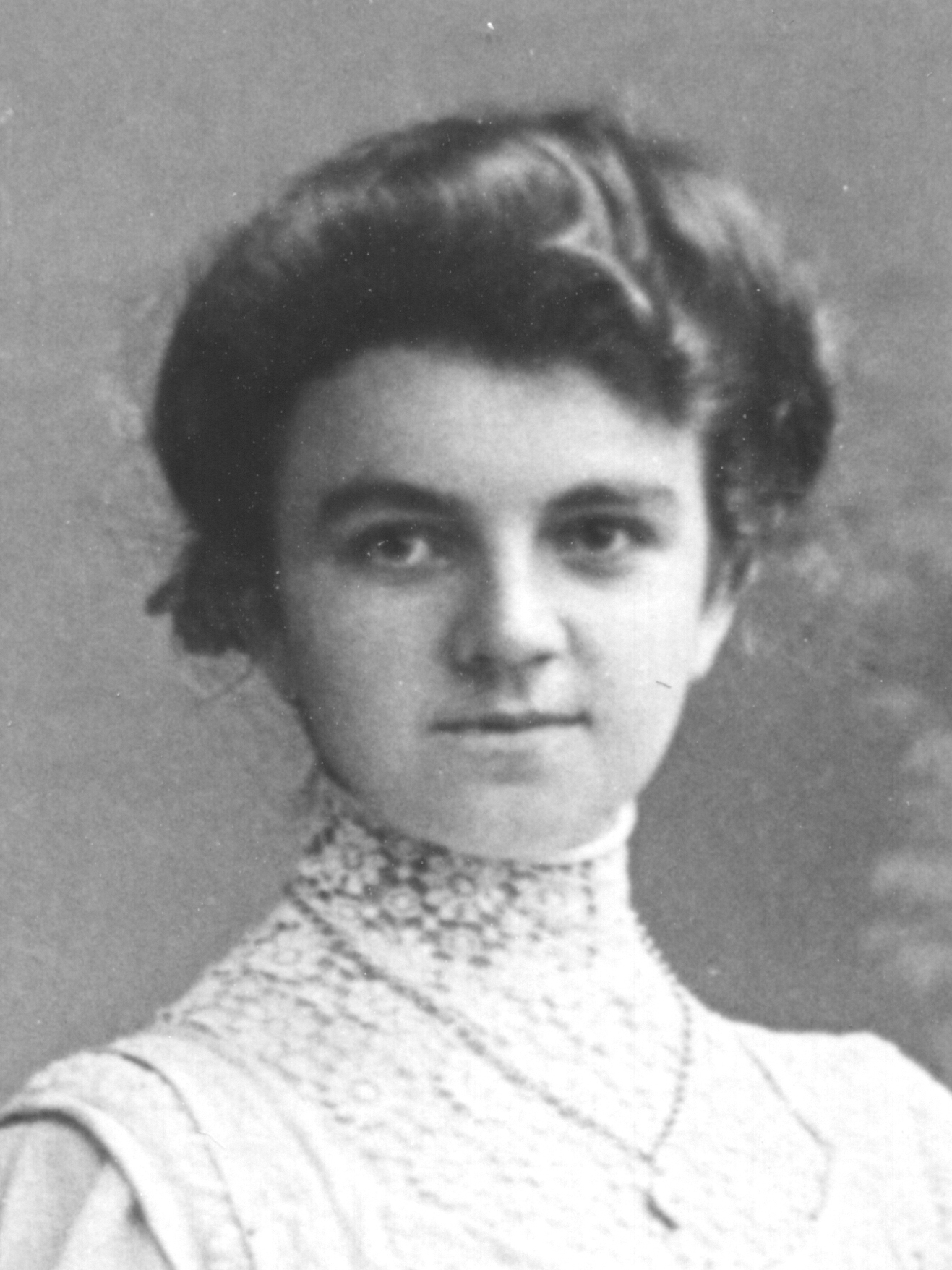
- Strohsahl c. 1905

Personal details
- Born: Anna Emilie Franze; 2 October 1885; Seifhennersdorf, German Empire
- Died: 1 January 1953 (aged 67)
- Spouse: John Eduard Strohsahl
- Children: 3

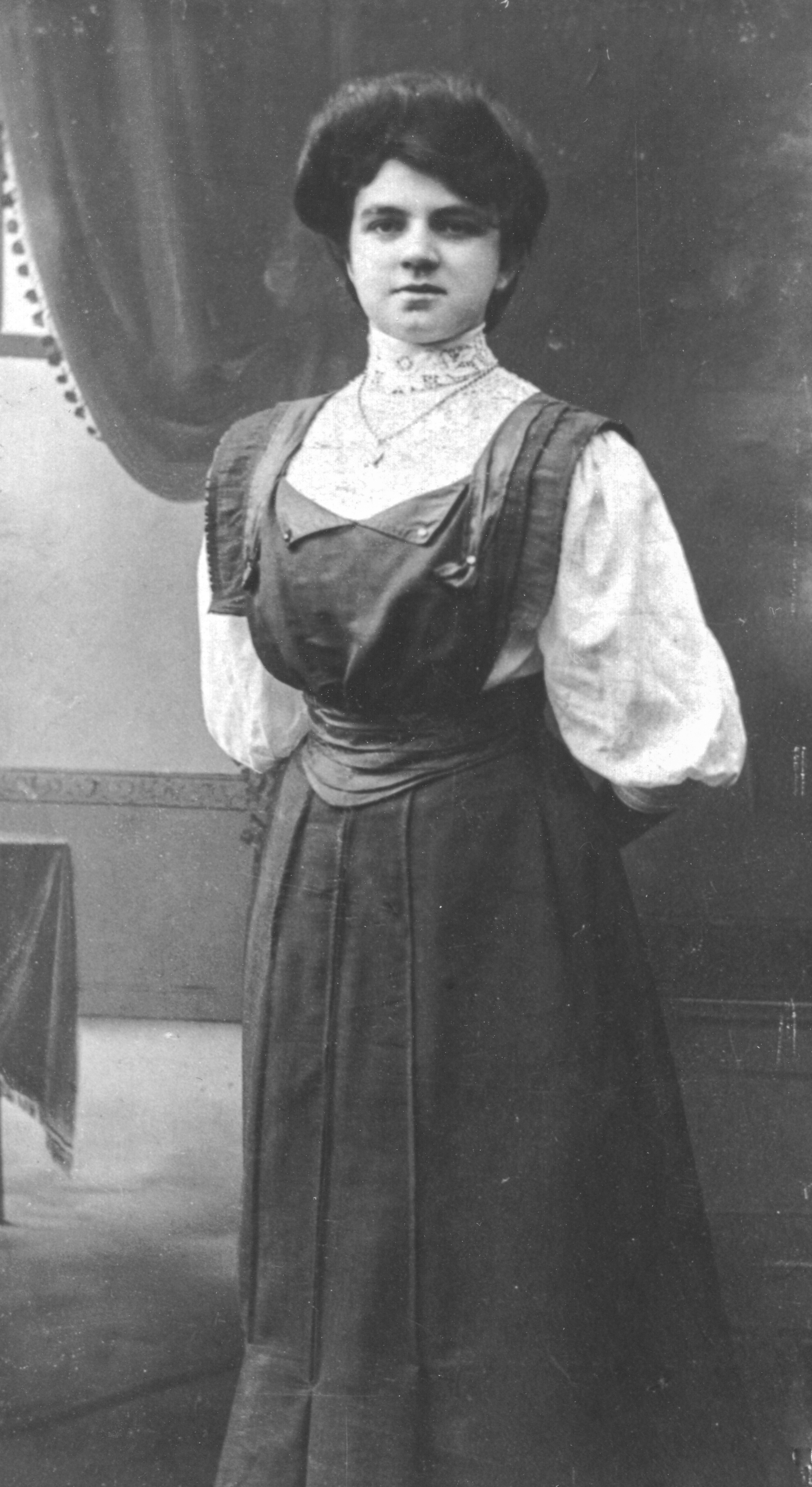
Anna Strohsahl, around 1905

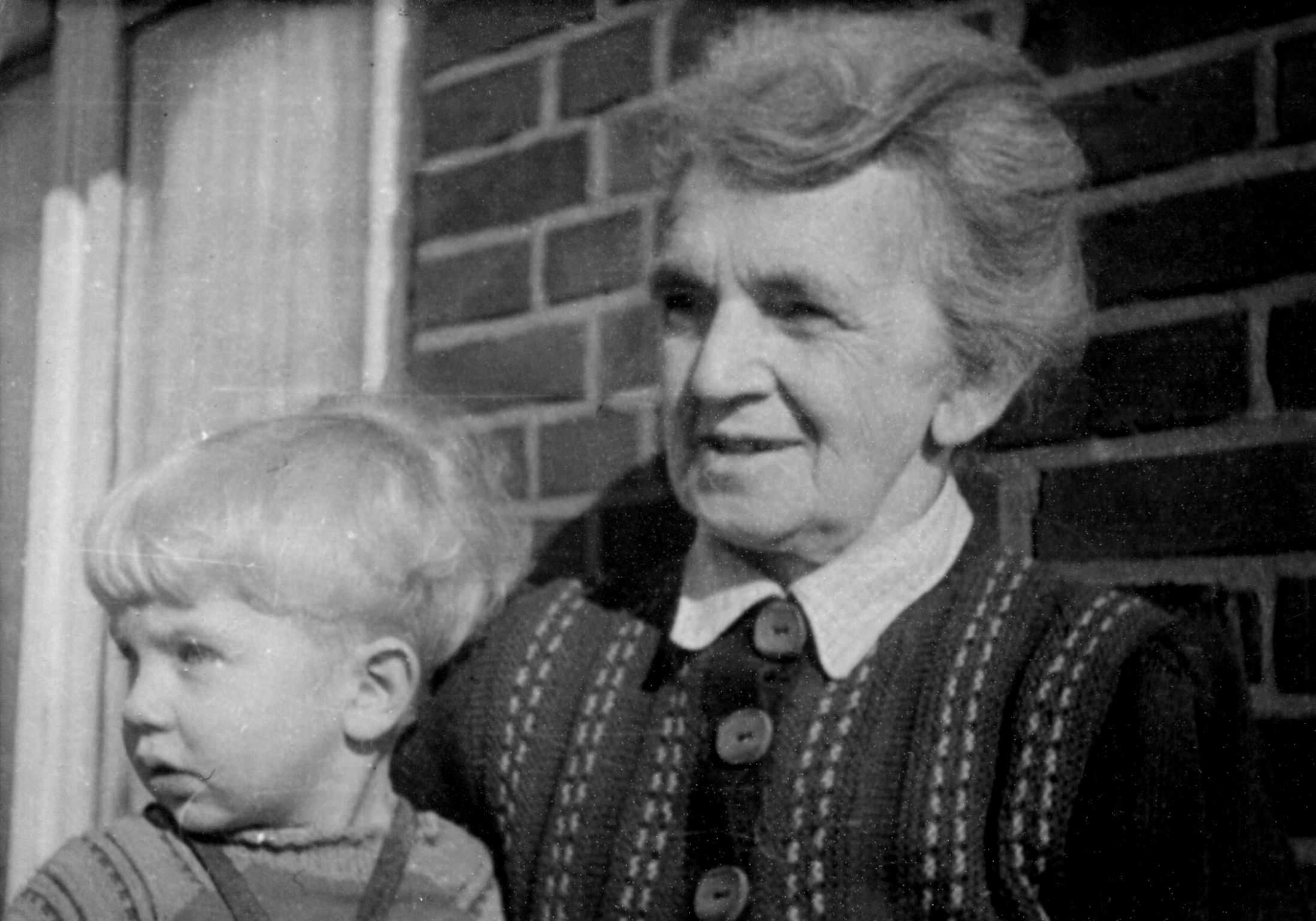
Anna Strohsahl 1950 with grandson Götz Strömsdörfer

Anna Emilie Strohsahl, born Franze (2 October 1885 – 1 January 1953) was a German politician (SPD) and the first female city councillor ("Ratsmann") in Cuxhaven City Parliament. Protesting the Nazi seizure of power, she left Cuxhaven Council in May 1933, together with the whole SPD group.

== Life ==
Anna Franze was born 2 October 1885 in Seifhennersdorf in Upper Lusatia as a daughter of brick mason Ernst Wilhelm Franze and weaver Christiane Auguste Franze. Lacking a higher school education or professional training, she started to work as a housemaid in Zittau, Bavaria, and Hamburg. In 1907, she came to Cuxhaven. On 3 July 1914, she married typographer John Eduard Strohsahl. The Strohsahls had daughters Ruth (1915), Erika (1917) and Sonja (1927, died shortly after birth).

== Political beginnings ==
Anna Strohsahl's political commitment started after World War I. Her husband was an editor with the social democratic newspaper Alter Liebe, for which she later also wrote articles. Together with other social democrats, she founded the SPD Cuxhaven Women's Group on 23 April 1920, and became its president on 2 June 1921.

== Citizen Parliament and Council ==
Strohsahl was elected into Cuxhaven Citizen Parliament on 2 March 1924. She and Olga Geerken (DDP) were the only women in Parliament. Strohsahl was elected into the school board, the board of further education and the welfare centre. She got involved with school education of workers' children and the support for pensioners, unemployed and homeless. The same year, she became delegate in the District Welfare Union ("Bezirksfürsorgeverband"). In 1925, she was elected into housing office. In spring 1927, she left Citizen Parliament but was elected again on 23 October 1927 as the only woman. She was elected into the District Welfare Union again.

Strohsahl called for more political commitment of women. She wrote in an article: "Also female voters must get used to following their representative's activities in Parliament."

After the elections on 19 October 1930, she was the only woman in Citizen Parliament again. On 31 October 1930, she became the first and only female city councillor ("Ratsmann") in the history of Cuxhaven City Parliament. There, she was elected into the youth welfare office. When Council dismissed the school's cleaning women whose husbands had a sufficient income as "double earners" in 1931, Strohsahl was the only councillor to vote against the lay off. On 3 September 1931, she left the Evangelical-Lutheran Church.

== Political work after 30 January 1933 ==
After the Nazi seizure of power work became harder for the Social Democrats in Cuxhaven. The NSDAP put the elected mayor Werner Grube (DVP) on leave, claiming that the composition of Council and City Parliament did no longer fit "the people's will". Grube was now temporarily deputised by government building officer Schätzler (NSDAP).

On 9 May 1933 the SPD councillors were removed from all boards. Strohsahl thereupon claimed that "it cannot be the sense of the Gleichschaltung to completely exclude the Left from cooperation, which is representing 4000 voters." 19 May 1933 the Council decided to pay the 50 Reichsmark expense allowance only to councillors heading a board in future. In a City Parliament session councillor Morisse declared to no longer setting value on the Social Democrats' work: "You don't have anything else to do than to be ashamed and to keep silent." After this, Strohsahl and the complete SPD group left the City Parliament. Following the prohibition of SPD on 22 June 1933 her political work ended for the time being.

During this time, the personal situation of the Strohsahl family worsened, harassing controls by the National Socialists increased. The supervisory school authority retroactively changed the passed high school diploma of her daughter Ruth from "good" to "poor/fail" which made her flee to the United Kingdom. With the prohibition of the newspaper Alter Liebe on 16 March 1933 John Strohsahl was unemployed. Anna Strohsahl supported her family during World War II as a house maid and a seamstress.

== Postwar period and death ==
On 22 November 1945, the British military government mandated Strohsahl and 29 other unencumbered city delegates to manage Cuxhaven until the free elections on 13 October 1946. Again, she was active in the welfare centre, the school board, and, starting June 1946 in the building board. On 29 October 1948 Anna Strohsahl was officially denazified. Due to a long illness, political work after 1946 was no longer possible. Strohsahl died on 1 January 1953.
