= Mycobacterium montefiorense =

Scientific classification
- Domain: Bacteria
- Kingdom: Bacillati
- Phylum: Actinomycetota
- Class: Actinomycetes
- Order: Mycobacteriales
- Family: Mycobacteriaceae
- Genus: Mycobacterium
- Species: M. montefiorense

Binomial name
- Mycobacterium montefiorense Levi et al. 2003, ATCC BAA-256

Species of bacterium

Mycobacterium montefiorense is a species of bacteria which causes granulomatous skin disease in moray eels. Sequence analysis of the 16S rRNA gene reveals M. montefiorense is most closely related to Mycobacterium triplex, an opportunistic pathogen of humans.

M. montefiorense was named after the Montefiore Medical Center, Bronx, N.Y., the medical institution where it was isolated.

== Description ==
M. montefiorense are acid-fast rods which grow on Middlebrook 7H10 media at 25 °C to form small, transparent, slow-growing colonies.

M. montefiorense does not grow at temperatures above 30 °C.

The strain ATCC BAA-256 = CCUG 51898 = DSM 44602.

== Pathogenesis ==
M. montefiorense has been demonstrated to cause granulomatous skin disease in moray eels.
