= Mycobacteroides chelonae =

Scientific classification
- Domain: Bacteria
- Kingdom: Bacillati
- Phylum: Actinomycetota
- Class: Actinomycetes
- Order: Mycobacteriales
- Family: Mycobacteriaceae
- Genus: Mycobacteroides
- Species: M. chelonae

Binomial name
- Mycobacteroides chelonae (Bergey et al. 1923) Gupta et al. 2018

Type strain
- ATCC 35752; CCUG 47445; CIP 104535; CM 6388; DSM 43804; JCM 6388; NCTC 946

Synonyms
- Mycobacterium chelonae corrig. Bergey et al. 1923 (Approved Lists 1980); Mycobacterium chelonei Bergey et al. 1923 (Approved Lists 1980)

Species of bacterium

Mycobacteroides chelonae (formerly Mycobacterium chelonae) is a species of bacteria from the phylum Actinomycetota belonging to the genus Mycobacteroides. Mycobacteroides chelonae is a rapidly growing aerobic bacteria that is found all throughout the environment, including within sewage and tap water. An opportunistic pathogen of vertebrates, it can cause actinomycetoma-like skin and soft tissue infections of humans and is also a leading cause of piscine tuberculosis.

The complete genome sequence of the M. chelonae CCUG 47445 type strain was deposited and published in DNA Data Bank of Japan, European Nucleotide Archive, and GenBank in 2016 under the accession number CP007220.

It is grouped in Runyon group IV.

== Epidemiology ==
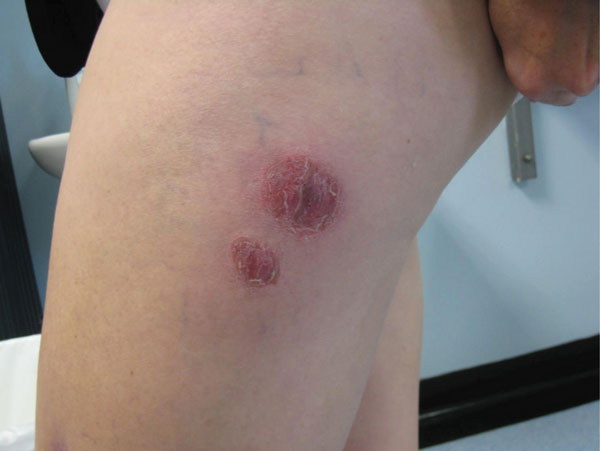
Mycobacteroides chelonae abscesses associated with the alternative medicine practice biomesotherapy.

On average, two cases of nonpulmonary M. chelonae infection are reported in South Australia each year. This bacterium is capable of causing skin, soft tissue, and bone infections, particularly after trauma and surgery. It has also been documented as a cause of mastitis after nipple piercing.
