= Mycobacterium farcinogenes =

Scientific classification
- Domain: Bacteria
- Kingdom: Bacillati
- Phylum: Actinomycetota
- Class: Actinomycetes
- Order: Mycobacteriales
- Family: Mycobacteriaceae
- Genus: Mycobacterium
- Species: M. farcinogenes

Binomial name
- Mycobacterium farcinogenes Chamoiseau 1973, ATCC 35753

Species of bacterium

Mycobacterium farcinogenes is a species of the phylum Actinomycetota (Gram-positive bacteria with high guanine and cytosine content, one of the dominant phyla of all bacteria), belonging to the genus Mycobacterium.

Although slow-growing, it is similar to fast-growing species, and is usually classified with them.

== Description ==
Gram-positive, nonmotile and strongly acid-fast rods. Short or long filaments, bent and branched, in clumps or tangled, lacy network.

Colony characteristics Rough, yellow and convoluted colonies. Firmly adherent to medium and surrounded by an iridescent halo.

Physiology

- Slow growth after 15–20 days on Löwenstein-Jensen medium.

Differential characteristics

- On the basis of characteristic lipids this species belongs to the genus Mycobacterium and not to the genus Nocardia.
- DNA homology to the closely related species Mycobacterium senegalense. Both species, share an identical 5' 16S rDNA sequence. However, the ITS sequences are different.

== Pathogenesis ==
- Causes farcy in African cattle.
- Distinctive pathogenicity for guinea pigs: on subcutaneous inoculation, M. farcinogenes produces draining and slow healing abscesses after 8 days.

== Type strain ==
- First isolated from lesions of farcy in African bovines (Chad).

Strain IEMVT 75 = ATCC 35753 = CCUG 21047 = DSM 43637 = NCTC 10955.
