= Mycobacterium heidelbergense =

Scientific classification
- Domain: Bacteria
- Kingdom: Bacillati
- Phylum: Actinomycetota
- Class: Actinomycetia
- Order: Mycobacteriales
- Family: Mycobacteriaceae
- Genus: Mycobacterium
- Species: M. heidelbergense

Binomial name
- Mycobacterium heidelbergense Haas et al. 1998, ATCC 51253

Species of bacterium

Mycobacterium heidelbergense is a Gram-positive, nonmotile, acid-fast coccobacillus. It is a species of the phylum Actinomycetota (Gram-positive bacteria with high guanine and cytosine content, one of the dominant phyla of all bacteria), belonging to the genus Mycobacterium.

== Description ==
Dimensions: 0.5-0.8 μm x 2.0-3.0 μm

Colony characteristics: Smooth, dome-like and nonpigmented colonies on Löwenstein–Jensen medium at 35 °C (0.5–1 mm in diameter).

Physiology: Slow growth on Löwenstein–Jensen medium at 35 °C within 3–4 weeks, optimal growth at a range from 33 to 35 °C, but also growth at 30 and 37 °C, growth at neither 25 nor at 45 °C, susceptible to isoniazid, rifampicin and ethambutol, resistant to pyrazinamide and cycloserine

Differential characteristics: Differentiation from M. malmoense, (bearing a strong phenotypic resemblance to M. heidelbergense), by its wider range of susceptibility to antituberculous drugs, (including isoniazid), and by its inability to grow on Löwenstein–Jensen medium at 25 °C, differentiation of M. triplex from M. heidelbergense by its positive nitrate reduction test and by its characteristic HPLC profile (triple-mycolate pattern).

Pathogenesis occurs in cervical lymph nodes (lymphadenitis) in immunocompetent patients. Its biosafety level is not known. The type strain was first isolated from an immunocompetent paediatric patient with cervical lymphadenitis with recurrent fistula formation, in Heidelberg, Germany. It is strain 2554/91 = ATCC 51253 = CIP 105424 = DSM 44471.
