= Mycobacterium interjectum =

Scientific classification
- Domain: Bacteria
- Kingdom: Bacillati
- Phylum: Actinomycetota
- Class: Actinomycetia
- Order: Mycobacteriales
- Family: Mycobacteriaceae
- Genus: Mycobacterium
- Species: M. interjectum

Binomial name
- Mycobacterium interjectum Springer et al. 1995, ATCC 51457

Species of bacterium

Mycobacterium interjectum is a species of the phylum Actinomycetota (Gram-positive bacteria with high guanine and cytosine content, one of the dominant phyla of all bacteria), belonging to the genus Mycobacterium.

== Name ==
Etymology: Phylogenetic position between (Latin: interjectum) rapidly and slowly growing mycobacteria.

== Description ==
Mycobacterium interjectum is Gram-positive, nonmotile and acid-fast rods (0.6-1.0 μm x 0.7-2.0 μm). Filaments (up to 6.0 μm) possible.

=== Colony characteristics ===
Dysgonic, smooth and scotochromogenic colonies (1–2 mm in diameter).

=== Physiology ===
- Slow growth on Löwenstein-Jensen medium at temperatures between 31°C and 37 °C within 3–4 weeks.
- Susceptible to rifampicin.
- Resistant to isoniazid and ethambutol.

Differential characteristics

- Most closely related to M. simiae.
- Phylogenetic position between rapidly and slowly growing mycobacteria.

== Pathogenesis ==
- Chronic lymphadenitis
- Biosafety level 2

== Type strain ==
- First isolated from a lymph node of a child with chronic lymphadenitis in Germany.

Strain 4185/92 = ATCC 51457 = CCUG 37514 = DSM 44064
