= Mycobacterium flavescens =

Scientific classification
- Domain: Bacteria
- Kingdom: Bacillati
- Phylum: Actinomycetota
- Class: Actinomycetia
- Order: Mycobacteriales
- Family: Mycobacteriaceae
- Genus: Mycobacterium
- Species: M. flavescens

Binomial name
- Mycobacterium flavescens Bojalil et al. 1962, ATCC 14474

Species of bacterium

Mycobacterium flavescens is a species of the phylum Actinomycetota (Gram-positive bacteria with high guanine and cytosine content, one of the dominant phyla of all bacteria), belonging to the genus Mycobacterium.

== Etymology ==
Its name is derived from the Latin word "flavescens", which means "becoming golden yellow."

== Description ==
Gram-positive, nonmotile and acid-fast rods.

=== Colony characteristics ===
- Rough, yellow-orange scotochromogenic, butyrous colonies.

=== Physiology ===
- Slow growth on Löwenstein-Jensen medium at 25-37 °C, but not at 45 °C within 7–10 days.
- Although growth rate is intermediate, metabolic and physiologic properties are more like rapidly growing species.

=== Differential characteristics ===
- Serologic specificity demonstrated by immunodiffusion.
- Related to Mycobacterium fortuitum: can be distinguished by its intense pigment production, and its slow rate of growth.

== Pathogenesis ==
Not associated with disease. Biosafety level 2.

== Type strain ==
- Normal human flora, environmental habitat.
- First isolated from a drug treated tuberculous guinea pig (Mexico).

Strain ATCC 14474 = CCUG 29041 = CIP 104533 = DSM 43991 = JCM 12274 = NCTC 10271 = NRRL B-4038.
