= Mycobacterium heckeshornense =

Scientific classification
- Domain: Bacteria
- Kingdom: Bacillati
- Phylum: Actinomycetota
- Class: Actinomycetia
- Order: Mycobacteriales
- Family: Mycobacteriaceae
- Genus: Mycobacterium
- Species: M. heckeshornense

Binomial name
- Mycobacterium heckeshornense Roth et al. 2001, DSM 44428

Species of bacterium

Mycobacterium heckeshornense is a species of the phylum Actinomycetota (Gram-positive bacteria with high guanine and cytosine content, one of the dominant phyla of all bacteria), belonging to the genus Mycobacterium.

== Description ==
Gram-positive, nonmotile and acid-fast rods. Cells are typically rod-shaped, with some coccoid forms.

Colony characteristics Smooth, yellow scotochromogenic colonies appear after 4 weeks of culture.

Physiology

- Slowly growing organism, colonies appear after 4 weeks of growth.
- Able to grow at 37 °C and 45 °C.

Differential characteristics

- The phylogenetic position of this species is within the cluster defined by M. xenopi and M. botniense.
- Key differentiating features are negative tests for arylsulfatase and pyrazinamidase and susceptibility to antimycobacterial drugs.

== Pathogenesis ==
- Seems to be pathogenic in immunocompetent humans.
- Biosafety level unknown

== Type strain ==
- The type strain was isolated from human lung by bronchoscopy.

Strain S369 = CCUG 51897 = DSM 44428
