= Seifhennersdorf =

- Town
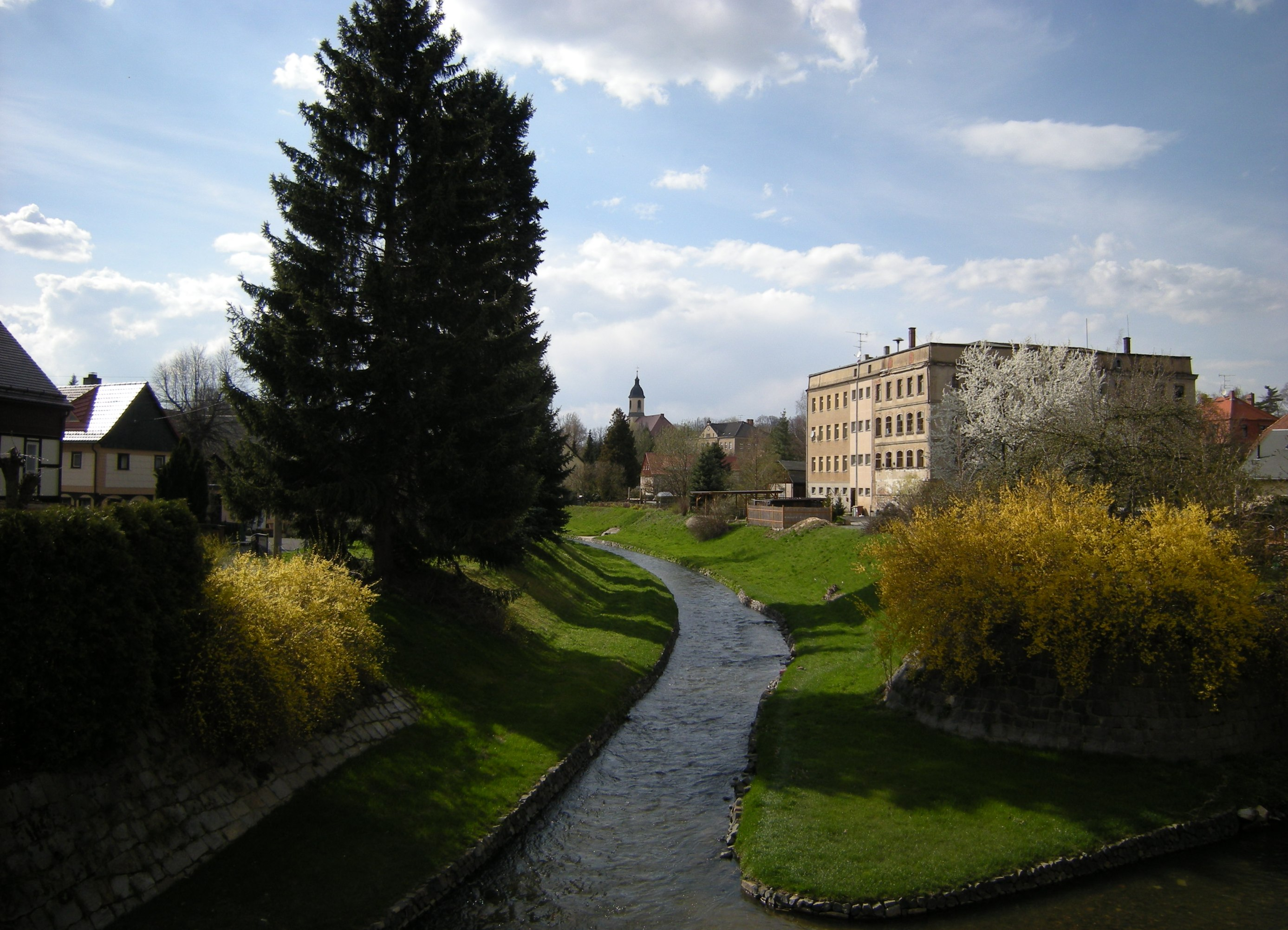

- Coat of arms

- Location of Seifhennersdorf within Görlitz district
- Interactive map of Seifhennersdorf
- Location within Germany Location within Saxony
- Coordinates: 50°56′N 14°37′E
- Country: Germany
- State: Saxony
- District: Görlitz

Government
  - Mayor (2023–30): Mandy Gubsch

Area
  - Total: 19.12 km^{2} (7.38 sq mi)
- Elevation: 360 m (1,180 ft)

Population (2025-12-31)
  - Total: 3,516
  - Density: 183.9/km^{2} (476.3/sq mi)
- Time zone: UTC+01:00 (CET)
  - Summer (DST): UTC+02:00 (CEST)
- Postal codes: 02782
- Dialling codes: 03586
- Vehicle registration: GR, LÖB, NOL, NY, WSW, ZI
- Website: www.seifhennersdorf.de

Seifhennersdorf (German pronunciation: [zaɪfˈhɛnɐsdɔʁf]; Upper Sorbian: Wodowe Hendrichecy) is a town in the district of Görlitz, in the Free State of Saxony, Germany. It is situated on the border with the Czech Republic, and the Czech towns of Rumburk and Varnsdorf lie across the border to the north-east and south of the town.

Seifhennersdorf is 8 kilometres (5 mi) south of Ebersbach and 14 kilometres (8.7 mi) west of Zittau.

== History ==
During World War II, a subcamp of Flossenbürg concentration camp was located in the town.

== Notable people ==
- Gottfried Grünewald (1673–1739), harpsichordist, opera singer and composer
- Rudolf Otto Neumann (1868-1952), hygienist and bacteriologist
- Bruno Paul (1874-1968), architect, illustrator, interior designer, and furniture designer.
- Anna Strohsahl (1885-1953), politician, first female city councillor of Cuxhaven
- Rica Reinisch (born 1965), Olympic swimmer
