= Mycobacterium branderi =

Scientific classification
- Domain: Bacteria
- Kingdom: Bacillati
- Phylum: Actinomycetota
- Class: Actinomycetia
- Order: Mycobacteriales
- Family: Mycobacteriaceae
- Genus: Mycobacterium
- Species: M. branderi

Binomial name
- Mycobacterium branderi Koukila-Kähkölä et al. 1995, ATCC 51304

Species of bacterium

Mycobacterium branderi is a slowly growing, nonchromogenic Mycobacterium first isolated from patients in Finland. Etymology: of Brander, referring to Eljas Brander, the former head of the Tuberculosis Laboratory of the National Public Health Institute, Finland, who collected the strains.

== Description ==
Microscopy

- Acid-fast delicate slender rods that are often slightly curved, 1.2 to 3 um long.

Colony characteristics

- Colonies are nonchromogenic and produce smooth, often umbonate, off-white to grayish colonies on Middlebrook 7H11 agar.

Physiology

- Slowly growing, reaching full colony size after 2 to 3 weeks.
- Growth is equally good at 37C and 45C and is only slightly delayed at 25C.
- The type strain is negative for Tween 80 hydrolysis, catalase, urease, and nitrate reductase activities and niacin.
- Strongly positive for arylsulfatase activity in 14-day tests and moderately to weakly positive for nicotinamidase and pyrazinamidase activities.
- In susceptibility tests the type strain was resistant to isoniazid, rifampin, pyrazinamide, and cycloserine but susceptible to ethambutol, streptomycin, ethionamide, and capreomycin.

Differential characteristics

- Differentiation by 16S rRNA sequencing
- Distinguishing of M. branderi from M. celatum by pigment production
- Differentiation of M. branderi from M. xenopi on the basis of good growth of M. branderi at room temperature, the lack of pigment production by M. branderi
- Differentiation of M. branderi and M. cookii: M. cookii is scotochromogenic and does not grow at 37 °C.

== Pathogenesis ==
- The first strains of M. branderi were isolated from samples obtained from nine patients, some of whom had cavitary mycobacteriosis of the lungs that was resistant to available drugs. In most cases, repeat samples obtained from each patient were positive for acid-fast bacilli as determined by microscopy, and the only cultivable species was M. branderi. M. branderi has to be considered a potential human pathogen.

== Type strain ==
- Strain 52157 = ATCC 51789 = CIP 104592 = DSM 44624 = JCM 12687.
