= Mycobacterium triplex =

Scientific classification
- Domain: Bacteria
- Kingdom: Bacillati
- Phylum: Actinomycetota
- Class: Actinomycetia
- Order: Mycobacteriales
- Family: Mycobacteriaceae
- Genus: Mycobacterium
- Species: M. triplex

Binomial name
- Mycobacterium triplex Floyd, et al. 1997

Species of bacterium

Mycobacterium triplex is a species of Mycobacterium.

It is closely related to Mycobacterium genavense.

It causes disease in immunocompromised patients.
