= Mycobacterium genavense =

Scientific classification
- Domain: Bacteria
- Kingdom: Bacillati
- Phylum: Actinomycetota
- Class: Actinomycetes
- Order: Mycobacteriales
- Family: Mycobacteriaceae
- Genus: Mycobacterium
- Species: M. genavense

Binomial name
- Mycobacterium genavense Böttger et al. 1993

Type strain
- 2289; ATCC 51234

Species of bacterium

Mycobacterium genavense is a slow-growing species of the phylum Actinomycetota (Gram-positive bacteria with high guanine and cytosine content, one of the dominant phyla of all bacteria), belonging to the genus Mycobacterium.

== Description ==
Nonmotile, acid-fast coccobacilli (1.0 μm x 2.0 μm). No formation of spores, capsules or aerial hyphae.

Colony characteristics

- Tiny, transparent, nonphotochromogenic and dysgonic colonies (on solid Middlebrook 7H11 medium MJ (Allied Laboratories).

Physiology

- Slow, fastidious growth in liquid media within 3–12 weeks at 31 °C, 37 °C and 42 °C, with slightly better growth at 45 °C.
- Primary cultures for isolation require liquid broth media such as BACTEC 12B medium, Middlebrook 7H9 medium.
- Acid broth media such as, BACTEC pyrazinamidase test medium, may facilitate primary isolation.
- No growth on standard solid media like Löwenstein-Jensen, unsupplemented Middlebrook 7H11 or Middlebrook 7H10 media.
- Visible growth on solid Middlebrook 7H11 medium supplemented with MJ after inoculation with a broth culture within 3–9 weeks.
- Susceptible to streptomycin and rifampicin
- Resistant to isoniazid

Differential characteristics

- Differentiation from other slowly growing mycobacteria by its fastidious growth.
- Closely related to M. simiae by evaluation of 16S rDNA sequences.

== Pathogenesis ==
- Opportunistic pathogen. Clinically indistinguishable from generalised infections in patients with AIDS due to Mycobacterium avium complex strains, but more related to gastro-intestinal disorders.
- Most common cause of mycobacterial disease in parrots and parakeets.

== Type strain ==
Strain 2289 = ATCC 51234
