= Rudolf Otto Neumann =

German hygienist

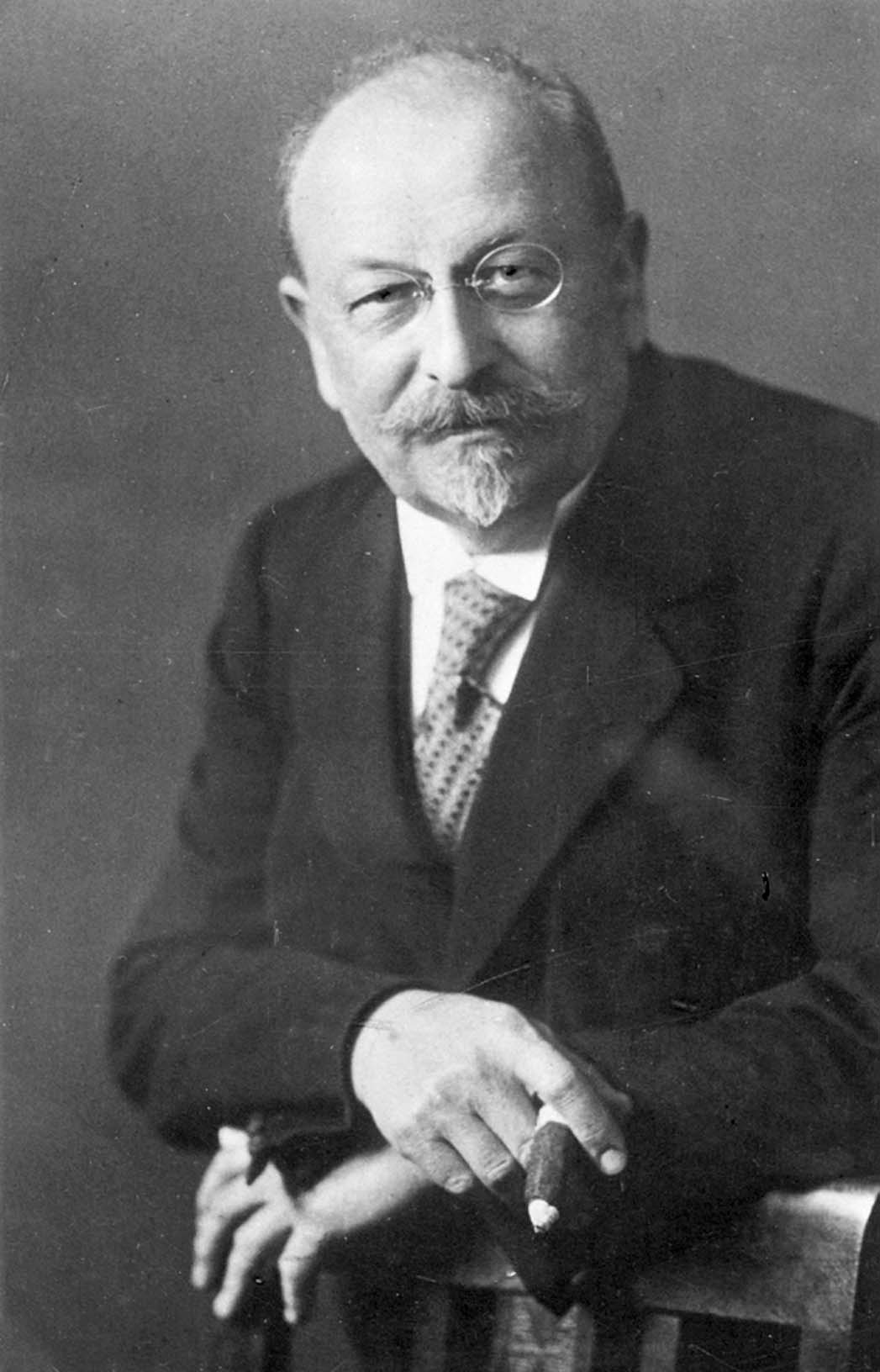

Rudolf Otto Neumann (29 June 1868, Seifhennersdorf - 5 April 1952, Hamburg) was a German hygienist.

He studied pharmacy and medicine at the Universities of Greifswald, Leipzig, Erlangen and Würzburg, receiving his habilitation in 1902 at the University of Kiel. In 1904 he relocated to Hamburg, where he was appointed departmental head of the state hygienic institute. During the same year he was part of an expedition to Brazil in order to research yellow fever.

From 1906 to 1910 he worked at the institute of hygiene at the University of Heidelberg, followed by a professorship in hygiene and bacteriology at the University of Giessen. In 1914 he was appointed director of the hygiene institute at the University of Bonn, and in 1922 succeeded William Philipps Dunbar (1853–1922) as director of the hygiene institute at the University of Hamburg. Neumann participated in many scientific trips during his career, including extended journeys to the Far East, the United States and Central America in 1928–1931.

As a scientist his work embraced bacteriology, tropical pathology, parasitology, food hygiene and nutrition. In the field of nutrition physiology he is renowned for his experiments involving metabolism. In his studies of nutrition, he was particularly interested in the protein quantity intake requirements for humans.

He was the author of over 125 scientific works, including books on bacteriology that he co-authored with Karl Bernhard Lehmann (1858–1940) that were later translated into English:

- "Atlas and principles of bacteriology" (1897)
- "Atlas and principles of bacteriology and text-book of special bacteriologic diagnosis" (1901)
- "Bacteriology; especially determinative bacteriology" (1930–31).
