= Mycobacterium thermoresistibile =

Scientific classification
- Domain: Bacteria
- Kingdom: Bacillati
- Phylum: Actinomycetota
- Class: Actinomycetia
- Order: Mycobacteriales
- Family: Mycobacteriaceae
- Genus: Mycobacterium
- Species: M. thermoresistibile

Binomial name
- Mycobacterium thermoresistibile Tsukamura 1966 (Approved Lists 1980)

Species of bacterium

Mycobacterium thermoresistibile is a species of Mycobacterium.
