= Biomesotherapy =

Alternative therapy

Biomesotherapy is a pseudoscientific therapy that combines homeopathy, mesotherapy, and acupuncture. Saline and/or homeopathic solutions are injected subcutaneously at or along traditional acupuncture sites. Oral administration of homeopathic formulations may also form part of the treatment. Biomesotherapy is marketed as a form of pain management or as a generalised wellness treatment. Biomesotherapy was implicated in a cluster of mycobacterial infections in Australia in 2008.

This therapy involves the oral administration of a homeopathic remedy and the injection of a sterile saline solution into certain trigger points in the body with the aim of stimulating the organ systems, which is known as the cutivistic response. Biomesotherapy is claimed designed to relax tense muscles, and primarily aims to help the body heal itself and normalize the nervous system. This therapy is often used to treat pain as a result of joint disease or other musculoskeletal problems. Biomesotherapy is claimed to help the body to treat the root of the pain. Biomesotherapy is not recommended for the treatment of heart disease, high blood pressure, depression, AIDS etc.

There is no evidence to the efficacy of the treatment.
