= Mycobacterium porcinum =

Scientific classification
- Domain: Bacteria
- Kingdom: Bacillati
- Phylum: Actinomycetota
- Class: Actinomycetia
- Order: Mycobacteriales
- Family: Mycobacteriaceae
- Genus: Mycobacterium
- Species: M. porcinum

Binomial name
- Mycobacterium porcinum Tsukamura et al. 1983

Species of bacterium

Mycobacterium porcinum is a species of Mycobacterium.
