= Mycobacterium palustre =

Scientific classification
- Domain: Bacteria
- Kingdom: Bacillati
- Phylum: Actinomycetota
- Class: Actinomycetia
- Order: Mycobacteriales
- Family: Mycobacteriaceae
- Genus: Mycobacterium
- Species: M. palustre

Binomial name
- Mycobacterium palustre Torkko et al. 2002, ATCC BAA-377

Species of bacterium

Mycobacterium palustre is a slowly growing mycobacterium first isolated from an environmental source in Finland. It is potentially pathogenic, and has been isolated from human and veterinary clinical specimens.

== Type strain ==
- First isolated from water from a stream in Finland.
- Strain E846 = ATCC BAA-377 = DSM 44572.
