= Karl Bernhard Lehmann =

German microbiologist

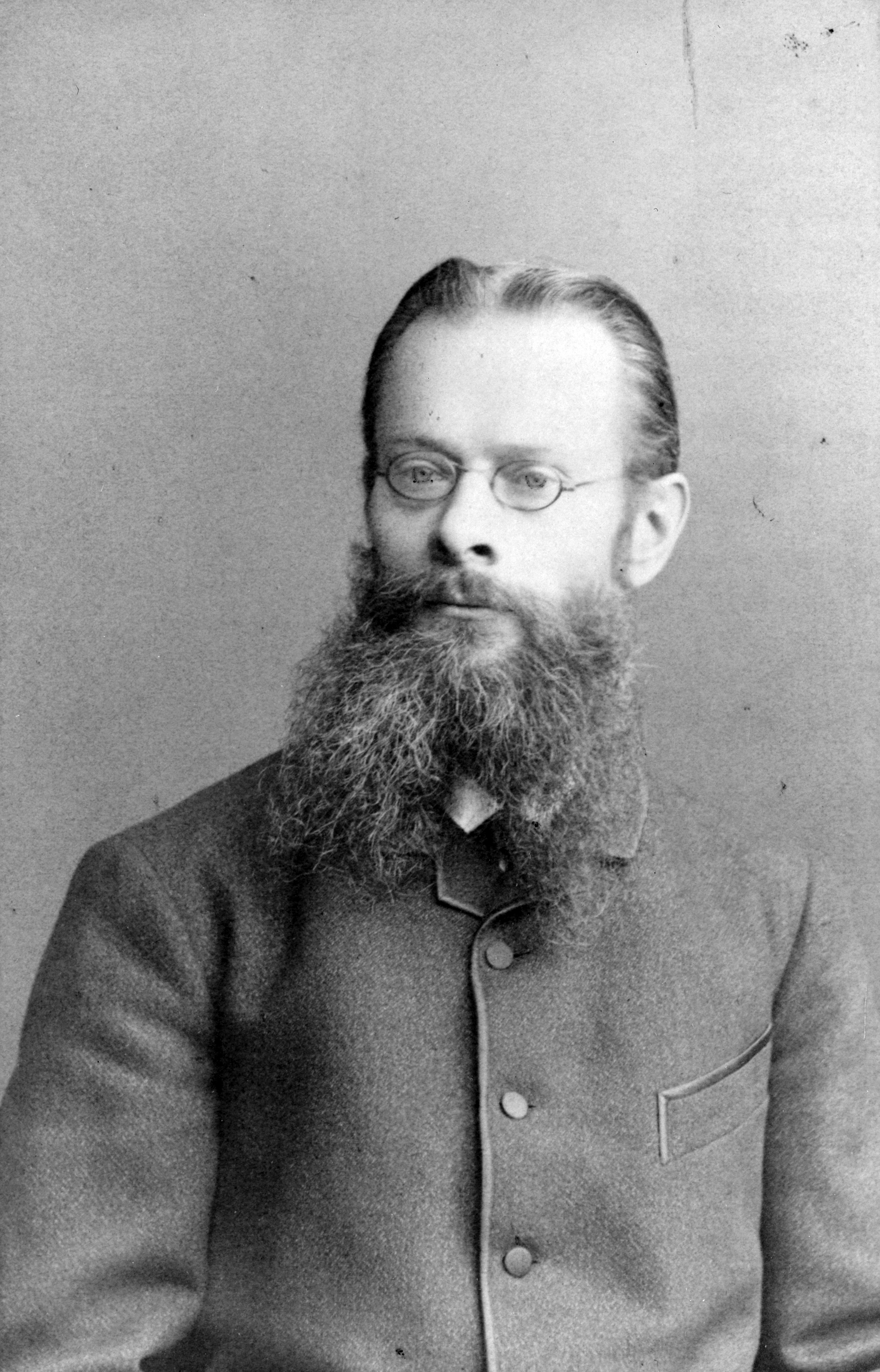
Karl Bernhard Lehmann (1890 photo)

Karl Bernhard Lehmann (27 September 1858 – 28 January 1940) was a German hygienist and bacteriologist born in Zurich. He was a brother to publisher Julius Friedrich Lehmann (1864–1935).

Lehmann studied medicine at the Ludwig-Maximilians-Universität München, where one of his instructors was Max von Pettenkofer (1818–1901). In 1886, he received his habilitation, and from 1894 to 1932 was a full professor of hygiene at the University of Würzburg (emeritus 1932).

He is remembered for pioneer toxicological research he performed with Ferdinand Flury (1877–1947), of which the exposure limits of various substances encountered in the workplace were tested and defined. Their research formed a basis of what would later be known as MAK values (Maximale Arbeitsplatz-Konzentration) in Germany.

In the field of microbiology he was co-author with Rudolf Otto Neumann (1868–1952) of Atlas und Grundriss der Bakteriologie und Lehrbuch der speziellen bakteriologischen Diagnostik, a manual/textbook which over several editions described a number of new bacterial species.

== Written works ==
- Atlas und Grundriss der Bakteriologie und Lehrbuch der speziellen bakteriologischen Diagnostik (Edition 1: Munich- 1896, from Edition 7- 1926-27: Bakteriologie, insbesondere bakteriologische Diagnostik); (with Rudolf Otto Neumann) - Atlas and principles of bacteriology and textbook of special bacteriologic diagnosis.
- Zur Psychologie und Hygiene der Genussmittel. Würzburg, 1912
- Gutachten des Reichs-Gesundheitsrats, betreffend die Abwässerbeseitigung der Stadt Offenbach a. Main. Berlin, 1913 - Opinion of the Reich Health Council, relating to sewage disposal in the city of Offenbach am Main.
- Die Bedeutung der Chromate für die Gesundheit der Arbeiter. Berlin, 1914 - The significance of chromate to the health of workers.
- Kurzes Lehrbuch der Arbeits- und Gewerbehygiene. Leipzig, 1919 - Short textbook of occupational and industrial hygiene.
- Die deutsche Bleifarbenindustrie vom Standpunkt der Hygiene. Berlin 1925 - The German lead paint industry from the standpoint of hygiene.
- Der Staub in der Industrie, seine Bedeutung für die Gesundheit der Arbeiter und die neueren Fortschritte auf dem Gebiete seiner Verhütung und Bekämpfung. Leipzig 1925 - Industrial dust, its importance involving the health of workers and recent advances in the field for its prevention and control.
- Über die Gesundheitsverhältnisse der Arbeiter in der deutschen keramischen insbesondere der Porzellan-Industrie mit besonderer Berücksichtigung der Tuberkulosefrage. Berlin 1929 - On the health conditions of workers in the German ceramic porcelain industry with particular attention paid to the question of tuberculosis
- Frohe Lebensarbeit (Lebenserinnerungen). Munich, 1933 -
- Toxikologie und Hygiene der technischen Lösungsmittel. Berlin, 1938 (with Ferdinand Flury) - Toxicology and hygiene of industrial solvents.
