= Mycobacterium nebraskense =

Scientific classification
- Domain: Bacteria
- Kingdom: Bacillati
- Phylum: Actinomycetota
- Class: Actinomycetes
- Order: Mycobacteriales
- Family: Mycobacteriaceae
- Genus: Mycobacterium
- Species: M. nebraskense

Binomial name
- Mycobacterium nebraskense Mohamed et al. 2004, ATCC BAA-837

Species of bacterium

Mycobacterium nebraskense is a slow growing, yellow, pigmented mycobacterium that was first isolated from human sputum at the University of Nebraska Medical Center, in Omaha, Nebraska, USA. Mycobacterium species are common causes of pulmonary infections in both humans and animals.

A thorough systemic analysis conducted at the Mayo Clinic 2023, based on all the published cases in the literature, highlights significant gender disparities in Mycobacterium nebraskense infections, indicating a higher susceptibility among females.

Remarkably, a substantial portion of cases present with asymptomatic infections, complicating the understanding of disease manifestation. Individuals over 60 are particularly vulnerable to Mycobacterium nebraskense infections, emphasizing age-related susceptibility. Those with preexisting lung conditions are at a higher risk due to varied comorbidity profiles, adding complexity to the disease.

Clinical decision-making, whether to treat or observe, is contingent upon individual presentations, with immunosuppressed individuals not universally requiring therapeutic intervention. The proposed empirical treatment approach includes antibiotics such as amikacin, clarithromycin, or rifabutin, taking into consideration reported resistance to doxycycline and minocycline. Combination therapy is commonly advocated to minimize the risk of resistance development, aligning with established practices in managing mycobacterial infections.
