= Aquarium granuloma =

- Other names: Fish tank granuloma, swimming pool granuloma
- Granuloma formation of the hand due to infection with Mycobacterium marinum.
- Specialty: Dermatology, infectious diseases
- Symptoms: skin lesions
- Treatment: antibiotics, surgery

Aquarium granuloma (also known as fish tank granuloma and swimming pool granuloma) is a rare skin condition caused by a non-tubercular mycobacterium known as Mycobacterium marinum. Skin infections with M. marinum in humans are relatively uncommon, and are usually acquired from contact with contaminated swimming pools, aquariums or infected fish.

== Signs and symptoms ==
Aquarium granuloma presents as a slow-growing, inflamed red bump (nodule or plaque) at the site of infection. It is characterized by a painful, itchy skin lesion, and may become ulcerated or crusted. Skin changes usually appear roughly three weeks after the aquatic exposure.

If this condition is acquired from an aquarium, then the dominant hand is often affected. If this condition is acquired from a swimming pool, then symptoms can also develop on trauma-prone body zones, such as the elbows, knees, feet and the tip of the nose.

Infections can be painful or painless and may be life threatening. They can be classified into four types:

- Type 1: Lesions in the form of crusted or ulcerated nodules or verrucous plaques developing within weeks or months after contact with bacterium.
- Type 2: Distributed inflammatory nodules spreading pattern or with abscesses and granulomas
- Type 3: Deep infections, with or without skin infection presenting signs of arthritis, tenosynovitis, osteomyelitis and/or bursitis
- Type 4: Lung infections and other systemic manifestations.

There is usually a long delay from symptom manifestation to diagnosis.

== Cause ==
For the infection to develop in humans, the two main factors required are exposure to contaminated water, and abrasion or injury to the skin. Hence, this infection is commonly seen in individuals who clean fish tanks, handle ornamental fish and work in wet fields.

Aquatic systems with a high density of fish and warm waters appear to be conditions particularly favorable to this infectious agent, and increase the chances to contract fish tank granuloma. Poor water quality and various nutritional deficiencies are also possible contributing factors.

Swimming pool granuloma can occur when there is inadequate chlorination of swimming pools.

== Diagnosis ==
Aquarium granuloma is relatively nonspecific in clinical presentation. Therefore, more common skin conditions, like cellulitis, foreign body reaction, skin cancer, and fungal or parasitic infections, are often explored first. Overall, diagnosis and treatment of this rare skin infection is often delayed because of a lack of suspicion.

Lab tests for finding M. marinum include cultures where a swab or sample is taken and grown in the laboratory. Cultures of M. marinum are fairly difficult to grow, and results may take several weeks. The culture may be negative, even if there is an active infection. Treatment may still be considered even if the test results are negative, especially if the patient's history supports past fish or fish-tank exposure.

In the absence of positive culture results, a skin or tissue biopsy may be a helpful test to render a microscopic diagnosis. Another technique that can be used to detect the bacteria is Polymerase chain reaction (PCR). A biopsy sample itself is sufficient to detect the exact type of bacteria by means of PCR.

== Prevention ==
- Avoid fresh or saltwater activities if there are open cuts, scrapes, or sores on the skin, especially in water where this bacterium is known to exist.
- Wear heavy gloves (leather or heavy cotton) while cleaning or processing fish, especially fish with sharp spines that may cause cuts to the hands and skin. Wash hands thoroughly with soap and water after fish processing or use a waterless cleanser.
- Wear waterproof gloves while cleaning home aquariums or fish tanks. Wash hands and forearms thoroughly with soap and running water after cleaning the tank, even if gloves were worn.
- Ensure regular and adequate chlorination of swimming pools to kill any bacteria that may be present.

== Treatment ==
Most skin and soft tissue infections are treated with a monotherapy of antibiotics clarithromycin, trimethoprim and ciprofloxacin, with deep infections being treated with a combination of two antibiotics such as ethambutol and rifampicin or doxycycline with minocycline. Antibiotic treatment ranged from 1–25 months with a median treatment time of 3.5 months. Since M. marinum has a high tendency for multi-drug resistance, treatment by one particular drug will not be effective. Often, up to six different antimicrobial regimes may be needed before the infection responds to a particular drug combination. This combination of antibiotics is based on the results of the culture and skin biopsy. The treatment can take up to several months.

Surgery may also be needed to remove dead tissue and for excision or debridement if the lesions do not clear with antibiotics. This helps the wound to heal.

== Epidemiology ==
Mycobacterium marinum infection is not contagious; it is not spreading from person to person. It is also not transmitted in hospitals like other common bacteria.

== See also ==
- Skin lesion
- List of cutaneous conditions
