= Middlebrook 7H11 Agar =

Growth medium used to culture Mycobacterium species

Middlebrook 7H11 agar is identical to Middlebrook 7H10 agar, with an addition of pancreatic digest of casein to facilitate the growth of fastidious cultures of M. tuberculosis.

Mycobactin J may also be added to Middlebrook 7H11 agar to allow the recovery of M. genavense.

== See also ==
- Lowenstein-Jensen medium
- Middlebrook 7H9 broth
