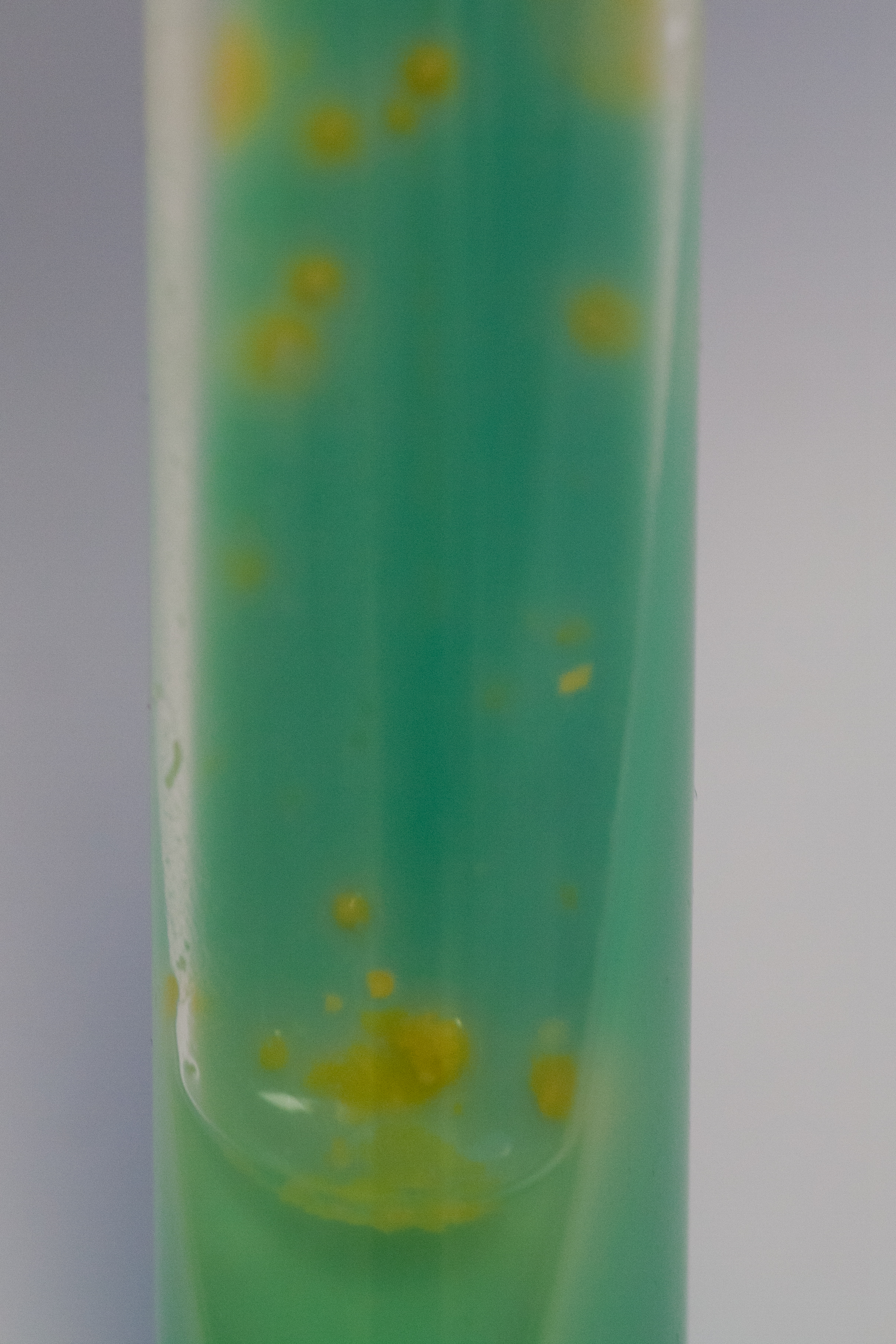

Scientific classification
- Domain: Bacteria
- Kingdom: Bacillati
- Phylum: Actinomycetota
- Class: Actinomycetes
- Order: Mycobacteriales
- Family: Mycobacteriaceae
- Genus: Mycobacterium
- Species: M. kansasii

Binomial name
- Mycobacterium kansasii Hauduroy 1955, ATCC 12478

= Mycobacterium kansasii =

Species of bacterium

Mycobacterium kansasii is a bacterium in the Mycobacterium genus. It is an environmental bacteria that causes opportunistic infections in humans, and is one of the leading mycobacterial causes of human disease after tuberculosis and leprosy.

== Description ==
Gram-positive, nonmotile, moderately-long to long, and acid-fast rods.

=== Colony characteristics ===
M. kansasii forms smooth to rough colonies after 7 or more days of incubation and is considered a slow grower. Colonies grown in dark are nonpigmented, when grown in light or when young colonies are exposed briefly to light, colonies become brilliant yellow (photochromogenic) according to the Runyon classification of Non-Tuberculous Mycobacteria. Oxygen is essential for the development of the pigment. If grown in a lighted incubator, most strains form dark red crystals of β-carotene on the surface and inside of colony.

=== Growth characteristics ===
M. kansasii grows on Middlebrook 7H10 agar at 37 °C. The species is classified as a slow grower and may take up to six weeks to grow. The species is resistant to pyrazinamide and susceptible to ethambutol.

=== Differential characteristics ===
It is closely related to the non-pathogenic, also slowly growing, nonpigmented, M. gastri. Both species share an identical 16S rDNA but differentiation is possible by differences in the ITS and hsp65 sequences. A commercial hybridisation assay (AccuProbe) to identify M. kansasii exists.

=== M. kansasii complex ===
Several former subtypes of M. kansasii have been reclassified as closely related species, and along with M. gastri form the M. kansasii complex (MKC). The species in the MKC are

- Mycobacterium kansasii (former subtype I)
- Mycobacterium persicum (former subtype II)
- Mycobacterium pseudokansasii (former subtype III)
- Mycobacterium ostraviense (former subtype IV)
- Mycobacterium innocens (former subtype V)
- Mycobacterium attenuatum (former subtype VI)
- and Mycobacterium gastri

== Discovery ==
Mycobacterium kansasii was first described in 1952 after being identified as the cause of two cases of disease resembling human pulmonary tuberculosis at Kansas City General Hospital and the University of Kansas Medical Center.

== Pathogenesis ==
M. kansasii may cause chronic human pulmonary disease resembling tuberculosis. Extrapulmonary infections, such as cervical lymphadenitis in children, cutaneous and soft tissues infections, and musculoskeletal system involvement are uncommon. Rarely it causes disseminated disease in patients with severely impaired cellular immunity (such as organ transplants or AIDS). Pre-existing lung disease such as silicosis is a risk factor. Mycobacterium kansasii occasionally involves the skin in a sporotrichoid pattern. It is unclear where people acquire the infection and person-to-person spread is not thought to occur. Tap water is believed to be the major reservoir associated with human disease. Biosafety level 2 is indicated.

== Type strain ==
First and most frequently isolated from human pulmonary secretions and lesions.

Strain ATCC 12478 = CIP 104589 = DSM 44162 = JCM 6379 = NCTC 13024.
