= Middlebrook 7H9 Broth =

Growth medium used to culture Mycobacterium species

Middlebrook 7H9 broth is a liquid growth medium specially used for culture of Mycobacterium species, notably Mycobacterium tuberculosis.

== Composition ==
- Ammonium sulfate
- L-Glutamic acid
- Sodium citrate
- Pyridoxine
- Biotin
- Disodium phosphate
- Monopotassium phosphate
- Ferric ammonium citrate
- Magnesium sulfate
- Calcium chloride
- Zinc sulfate
- Copper sulfate

Middlebrook 7H9 broth supports the growth of mycobacterial species when supplemented with nutrients such as glycerol, oleic acid, albumin, and dextrose, except for Mycobacterium bovis, which is inhibited by glycerol. Cultures should be read within 5–7 days after inoculation and once a week thereafter for up to 8 weeks.

Middlebrook broth is commonly used in the preparation of inocula for antimicrobial assays, biochemical tests (arylsufatase and tellurite reduction), and maintenance of stock strains.

Additionally, 7H9 broth is used as a medium in the mycobacteria growth indicator tube.

== See also ==
- Lowenstein-Jensen medium
- Middlebrook 7H10 agar
