= Mycobacterium simiae =

Scientific classification
- Domain: Bacteria
- Kingdom: Bacillati
- Phylum: Actinomycetota
- Class: Actinomycetia
- Order: Mycobacteriales
- Family: Mycobacteriaceae
- Genus: Mycobacterium
- Species: M. simiae

Binomial name
- Mycobacterium simiae Karassova et al. 1965 (Approved Lists 1980)

Species of bacterium

Mycobacterium simiae is a species of Mycobacterium. As per Runyon's classification it is classified as a photochromogen as it produces pigments only when exposed to light.
