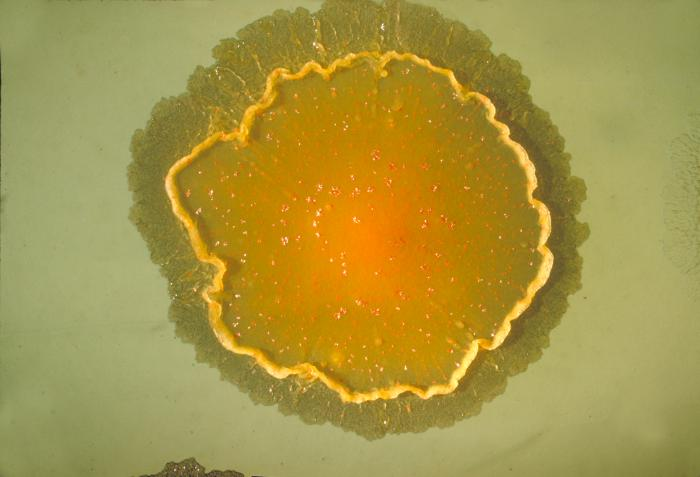

Scientific classification
- Domain: Bacteria
- Kingdom: Bacillati
- Phylum: Actinomycetota
- Class: Actinomycetes
- Order: Mycobacteriales
- Family: Mycobacteriaceae
- Genus: Mycobacterium
- Species: M. marinum

Binomial name
- Mycobacterium marinum Aronson 1926 (Approved Lists 1980)

= Mycobacterium marinum =

Species of bacterium

Mycobacterium marinum is a slow growing fresh and saltwater mycobacterium (SGM) belonging to the genus Mycobacterium and the phylum Actinobacteria. It was formerly known as Mycobacterium balnei. The strain marinum was first identified by Joseph D. Aronson in 1926 and it is observed as a pathogenic mycobacterium causing tuberculosis-like infections in fish (mycobacteriosis) and skin lesions in humans. The bacteria grows optimally at a temperature around 30 °C.

== Human infection ==
See aquarium granuloma

Mycobacterium marinum is an acid-fast, aerobic bacterium which can infect humans. Infection is usually associated either with swimming, preparing sea food, or with keeping or working with aquarium fish. Infections of humans are rare due to the chlorination of water. The bacteria penetrate the skin through trauma, usually from bites, injuries from fins, and penetration from foreign objects. The infection is not transmittable from person to person.

The bacteria invade macrophages, preventing the fusion of phagosome-lysosome and replicating inside.

A rare case of human infection was detected when a three year old American child was bitten by an iguana in Costa Rica in March 2022. It is the first bite related infection as most infections develop when an open wound comes into contact with contaminated water. The case was part of the programme of a scientific congress in Copenhagen in April 2023.

== Phylogeny ==
Initial phylogenetic studies using the gene 16S rDNA sequence data shows M. marinum is close to M. tuberculosis and M. ulcerans.

Whole genome sequence of M. marinum (M strain) was first published in 2008 and later with the emergence of Next Generation Sequencing (NGS), marinum type strain or patient isolates genome sequences were published.
