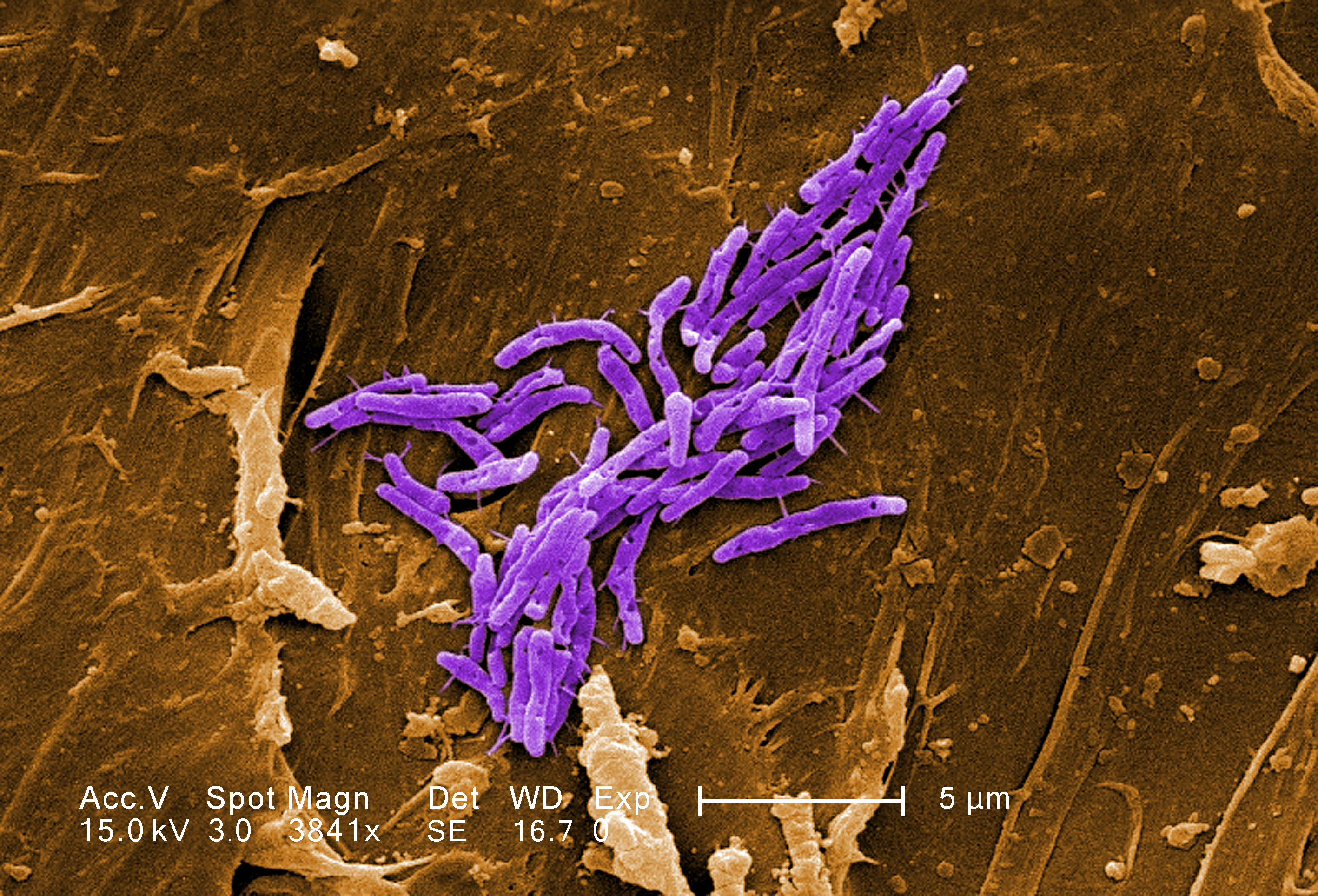
- A scanning electron micrograph of Mycobacterium fortuitum

Scientific classification
- Domain: Bacteria
- Kingdom: Bacillati
- Phylum: Actinomycetota
- Class: Actinomycetes
- Order: Mycobacteriales
- Family: Mycobacteriaceae
- Genus: Mycobacterium
- Species: M. fortuitum

Binomial name
- Mycobacterium fortuitum Da Costa Cruz 1938, ATCC 6841

= Mycobacterium fortuitum =

Species of bacterium

Mycobacterium fortuitum is a nontuberculous species of the phylum Actinomycetota (Gram-positive bacteria with high guanine and cytosine content, one of the dominant phyla of all bacteria), belonging to the genus Mycobacterium.

== Background ==
Mycobacterium fortuitum is a fast-growing species that can cause infections. The term "fast growing" is a reference to a growth rate of 3 or 4 days, when compared to other Mycobacteria that may take weeks to grow out on laboratory media. Pulmonary infections of M. fortuitum are uncommon, but Mycobacterium fortuitum can cause local skin disease, osteomyelitis (inflammation of the bone), joint infections and infections of the eye after trauma. Mycobacterium fortuitum has a worldwide distribution and can be found in natural and processed water, sewage, and dirt.

Bacteria classified as Mycobacteria, include the causative agents for tuberculosis and leprosy. Mycobacteria are sometimes referred to as “acid-fast bacteria,” a term referencing their response to a laboratory staining technique. This simply means that when microscopic slides of these bacteria are rinsed with an acidic solution, they retain a red dye. Mycobacterium fortuitum is one of the many species of nontuberculosis mycobacteria (NTM) that are commonly found in the environment. These are not involved in tuberculosis. This does not mean, however, that they will not cause an infection in the right circumstances.

M. fortuitum infection can be a nosocomial (hospital acquired) disease. Surgical sites may become infected after the wound is exposed directly or indirectly to contaminated tap water. Other possible sources of M. fortuitum infection include implanted devices such as catheters, injection site abscesses, and contaminated endoscopes.

M. fortuitum is a leading cause of piscine tuberculosis.

== Description ==
Gram-positive, nonmotile and acid-fast rods (1-3 μm x 0.2-0.4 μm). Sometimes long rods with occasional beaded or swollen cells having non-acid-fast ovoid bodies at one end.

Colony characteristics

- Smooth hemispheric colonies, usually off-white or cream colored. May be butyrous, waxy, multilobate and even rosette clustered (dilute inocula).
- On Malachite green containing media, such as Löwenstein-Jensen media, colonies can absorb the green dye.

Physiology

- Rapid growth on Löwenstein-Jensen media within 2–4 days.
- No growth at 45 °C, but grows on MacConkey agar.

Differential characteristics

- Differentiation from M. fortuitum subsp. acetamidolyticum by its ability to use L-glutamate and its inability to use acetamide as simultaneous nitrogen and carbon source. Both subspecies share an identical 5'-16S rDNA sequence. However, the ITS sequences are different.

== Pathogenesis ==
- Different types of sporadic infections: pulmonary disease, local abscesses.
- Postoperative sternal wound infections, endocarditis, meningitis, and osteomyelitis.
- Has produced postoperative infections after breast augmentation surgery.
- Biosafety level 2

== Treatment ==
The 2007 guideline “Official American Thoracic Society (ATS) and Infectious Diseases Society of America (IDSA) statement: diagnosis, treatment, and prevention of non-tuberculosis mycobacterial diseases”, notes that M. fortuitum isolates are usually susceptible to multiple oral antimicrobial agents, including the macrolides, quinolones, some tetracyclines, and sulfonamides, as well as the intravenous carbapenems (e.g. imipenem). Ondansetron HCL (Zofran) is an antiemetic often given to offset the nausea and vomiting that are a common side effect of Imipenem. Severe infections require IV treatment combined with oral antibiotics for a prolonged period, up to several months. The guideline recommends “for serious skin, bone, and soft tissue M fortuitum disease, a minimum of 4 months of therapy with at least two agents with in vitro activity against the clinical isolate is necessary to provide a high likelihood of cure. Surgery is generally indicated with extensive disease, abscess formation, or where drug therapy is difficult.”

== Type strain ==
- Found world-wide in soil, dust, rivers, lakes and tap water.
- First isolated from a 25-year-old patient (syringe abscess) in Rio de Janeiro.
- Also isolated from lymph glands of cattle and systemic or nodular infection of frogs.

Strain ATCC 6841 = CCUG 20994 = CIP 104534 = DSM 46621 = IFO (now NBRC) 13159 = JCM 6387 = NCTC 10394.

Subsequently, this species has been divided into subspecies M. fortuitum subsp. acetamidolyticum
