= Middlebrook 7H10 Agar =

Growth medium used to culture Mycobacterium species

Middlebrook 7H10 Agar is a solid growth medium specially used for culture of Mycobacterium, notably Mycobacterium tuberculosis. It has been reported that the 7H10 medium tends to grow fewer contaminants than the egg-based media commonly used for the cultivation of mycobacteria.

== Composition ==
Ingredients (g/L)

- Ammonium sulfate, 0.50
- Monopotassium phosphate, 1.50
- Disodium phosphate, 1.50
- Sodium citrate, 0.40
- Magnesium sulfate, 0.025
- Zinc sulfate, 0.001
- Copper sulfate, 0.001
- L-Glutamic acid, 0.50
- Ferric ammonium citrate, 0.04
- Pyridoxine hydrochloride, 0.001
- Biotin, 0.0005
- Malachite green, 0.00025
- Agar, 15.00
- Calcium chloride, 0.0005

Cultures should be read within 5–7 days after inoculation and once a week thereafter for up to 8 weeks.

== See also ==
- Lowenstein-Jensen medium
- Middlebrook 7H9 Broth
