= Niacin test =

Bacterial lab test

The niacin test has been widely used since the 1960s to identify mycobacteria at the species level in the clinical laboratory. The niacin test detects niacin (nicotinic acid) in aqueous extracts of a culture. M. tuberculosis strains that test negative for the niacin test are very rare. Redox reactions happening in Mycobacterium species produce niacin as a part of energy metabolism. Even though all mycobacteria produce niacin, M. tuberculosis accumulates an excess of niacin because of its inability to process niacin, excreting the excess niacin into the culture media, thus allowing it to be detected using the niacin test. The niacin test is typically only conducted on slow-growing, granular, tan colored colonies, as these are the morphology characteristics of M. tuberculosis on an agar plate. Because of its affordability compared to expensive identification methods like pyrosequencing or MALDI-TOF MS that require expensive machines and reagents.

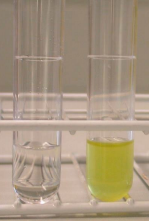
A negative niacin test on the left, a positive niacin test on the right.

== Biochemical processes ==
=== Biochemical pathway ===
The nicotinamide adenine dinucleotide (NAD+) degradation pathway in M. tuberculosis has a blockade that the scavenging pathway resulting in an excess of niacin that cannot be processed by the organism. Because of this abundance, the M. tuberculosis along with Mycobacterium canettii and varied types of Mycobacterium africanum release the excess niacin into their outside environment, in this case, the agar plate or another medium. Niacin is water-soluble, so the culture media can be tested for the presence of niacin to determine whether a Mycobacterium isolate is one of the three mentioned species. Those three species are members of the Mycobacterium tuberculosis complex.

=== Test strip process ===
The niacin test strip is typically composed of potassium thiocyanate, chloramine-T, citric acid, and 4-Aminosalicylic acid. In the presence of citric acid, chloramine-T and potassium thiocyanate will react to form cyanogen chloride. This chemical will break apart the pyridine ring of niacin to produce y-carboxy glutaconic aldehyde and joins an aromatic amine to form a yellow color.

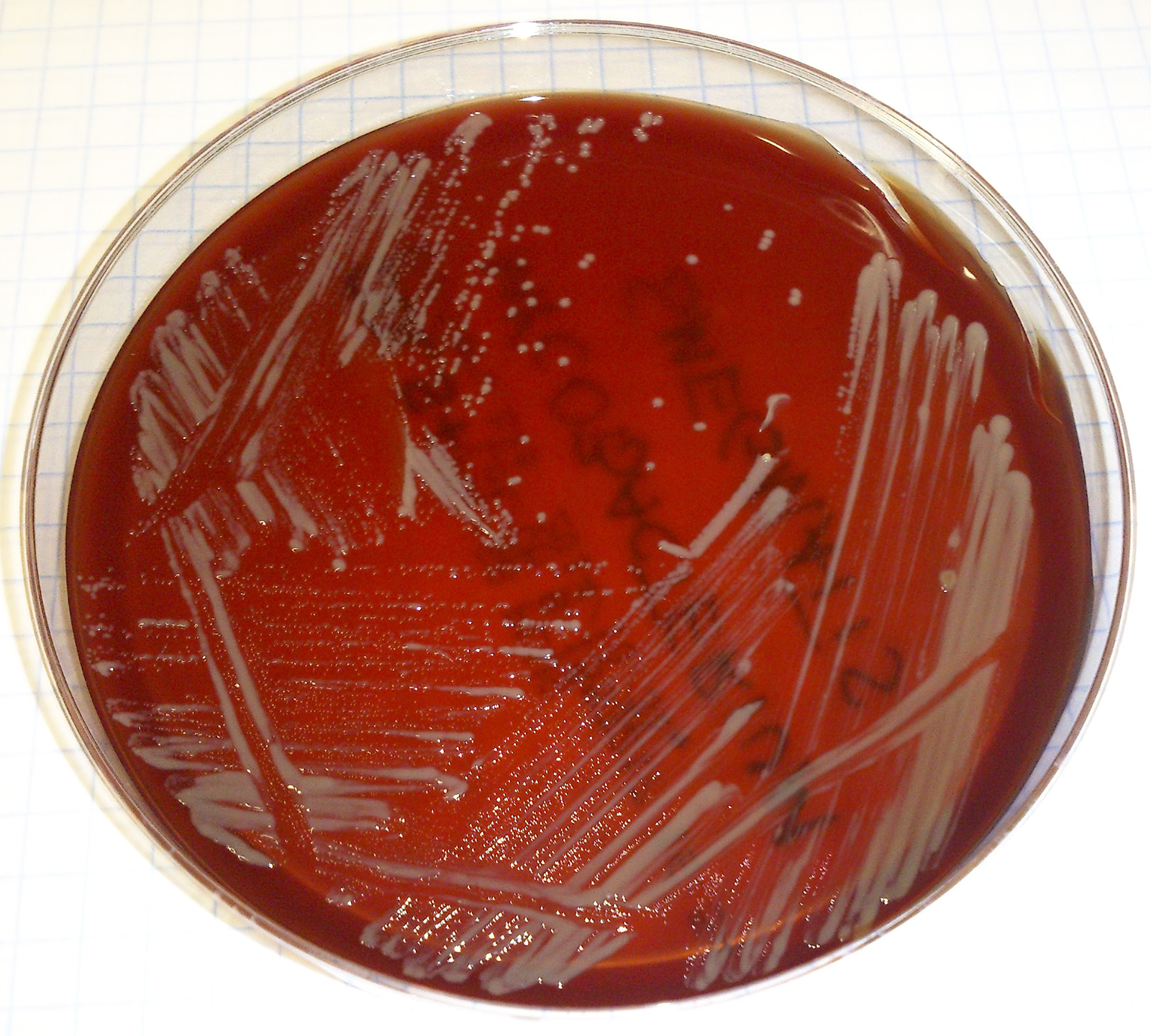
Mycobacterium smegmatis (negative for the niacin test)

== Testing procedure ==
A niacin test strip is similar in appearance to a pH test strip. It is small, thin, rectangular, and white in color. Water is placed onto the culture plate and touched with a test strip for 15–20 minutes inside a small, sterile tube. If excess amounts of niacin are detected, the liquid inside the tube will turn yellow, a positive test. If the liquid in the tube is clear, there are no excess amounts of niacin and the test is negative. A positive niacin test does not necessarily indicate the presence of M. tuberculosis because other Mycobacterium species can test positive for excess niacin.

Along with each batch of specimens being tested, a positive control of M. tuberculosis and a negative control with no organism will be included. If the positive control tests negative, there was probably an error with the batch, and likewise for a negative test showing positive.

Because lab samples that are determined to be acid-fast bacilli are possibly M. tuberculosis, a biosafety level 3 organism, all niacin tests must be conducted in a biosafety cabinet with a full gown, respirator, gloves, and sealed laboratory to ensure the safety of the laboratory technician performing the test. All tests must also be conducted with sterile technique.
