= Hiba Mohamed =

Sudanese molecular biologist (1968-)

- هبة صلاح الدين محمد
- Born: 18 January 1968 (age 58)
- Education: University of Khartoum; University of Cambridge
- Awards: Royal Society Pfizer Award
- Scientific career
- Fields: Molecular Genetics
- Workplaces: University of Khartoum; Al-Neelain University
- Thesis: The role of Host Genetics in Susceptibility to Kala-azar in the Sudan

Hiba Salah-Eldin Mohamed (Arabic: هبة صلاح الدين محمد, born 18 January 1968) is a Sudanese molecular biologist who works at the University of Khartoum. She won the 2007 Royal Society Pfizer Award.

== Early life and education ==
Hiba studied zoology at the University of Khartoum, earning a bachelor's degree in 1993 and a master's in 1998. She moved to the University of Cambridge Institute for Medical Research (CIMR) for her PhD in 2002. Her doctoral research, "The role of Host Genetics in Susceptibility to Kala-azar in The Sudan", was under the supervision of Jenefer Blackwell. She remained at the CIMR as a postdoctoral fellow.

== Research ==
Hiba was awarded a Wellcome Trust Research Development Award, and moved back to the University of Khartoum to be a professor in the Department of Molecular Biology. Her research focuses on understanding the genetics of Visceral leishmaniasis.

She was awarded the 2007 Royal Society Pfizer Award for her research into the disease, which is transmitted by sandfly bites. There is no vaccine or effective treatment, and up to 350 million people are at risk worldwide. Hiba was part of the Royal Society Africa Week celebrations in 2008. In 2010, Hiba was appointed a Fellow of the Global Young Academy.

== Selected publications ==
- Blackwell, Jenefer M; Searle, Susan; Mohamed, Hiba; White, Jacqueline K (2003-01-22). Divalent cation transport and susceptibility to infectious and autoimmune disease: continuation of the Ity/Lsh/Bcg/Nramp1/Slc11a1 gene story. Immunology Letters. 85 (2): 197–203. doi:10.1016/S0165-2478(02)00231-6. ISSN 0165-2478.
- Mohamed, Hiba Salah; Ibrahim, Muntaser Eltayeb; Miller, Elinor Nancy; White, Jacqueline Katie; Cordell, Heather Jane; Howson, Joanna McCammond McGill; Peacock, Christopher Sean; Khalil, Eltahir Awad Gasim; El Hassan, Ahmed Mohamed; Blackwell, Jenefer Mary (January 2004). SLC11A1 (formerly NRAMP1) and susceptibility to visceral leishmaniasis in The Sudan. European Journal of Human Genetics. 12 (1): 66–74. doi:10.1038/sj.ejhg.5201089. ISSN 1476-5438.
- Blackwell, J. M.; Fakiola, M.; Ibrahim, M. E.; Jamieson, S. E.; Jeronimo, S. B.; Miller, E. N.; Mishra, A.; Mohamed, H. S.; Peacock, C. S.; Raju, M.; Sundar, S.; Wilson, M. E. (May 2009). Genetics and visceral leishmaniasis: of mice and man. Parasite Immunology. 31 (5): 254–266. doi:10.1111/j.1365-3024.2009.01102.x. PMC 3160815. PMID 19388946.
- Mohamed, H. S.; Ibrahim, M. E.; Miller, E. N.; Peacock, C. S.; Khalil, E. a. G.; Cordell, H. J.; Howson, J. M. M.; El Hassan, A. M.; Bereir, R. E. H.; Blackwell, J. M. (July 2003). Genetic susceptibility to visceral leishmaniasis in The Sudan: linkage and association with IL4 and IFNGR1. Genes & Immunity. 4 (5): 351–355. doi:10.1038/sj.gene.6363977. ISSN 1476-5470

== See also ==
- Sultan Hassan
- Nashwa Eassa
- Layla Zakaria Abdel Rahman
