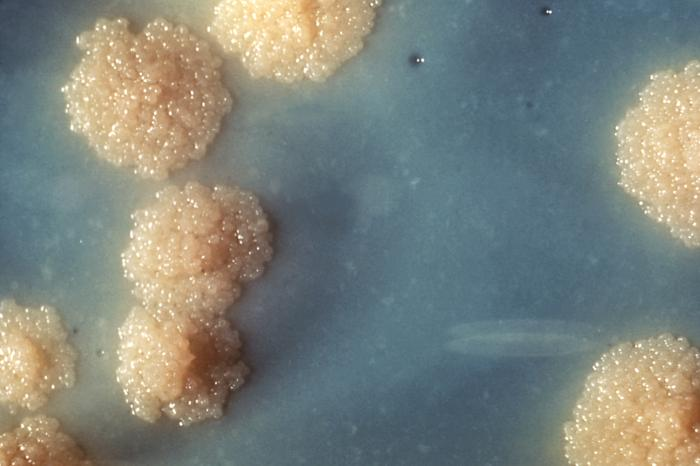
- M. tuberculosis colony

Scientific classification
- Domain: Bacteria
- Kingdom: Bacillati
- Phylum: Actinomycetota
- Class: Actinomycetes
- Order: Mycobacteriales
- Family: Mycobacteriaceae
- Genus: Mycobacterium
- Species: M. tuberculosis

Binomial name
- Mycobacterium tuberculosis Zopf 1883

Synonyms
- Tubercle bacillus Koch 1882

= Mycobacterium tuberculosis =

Bacterium that causes tuberculosis

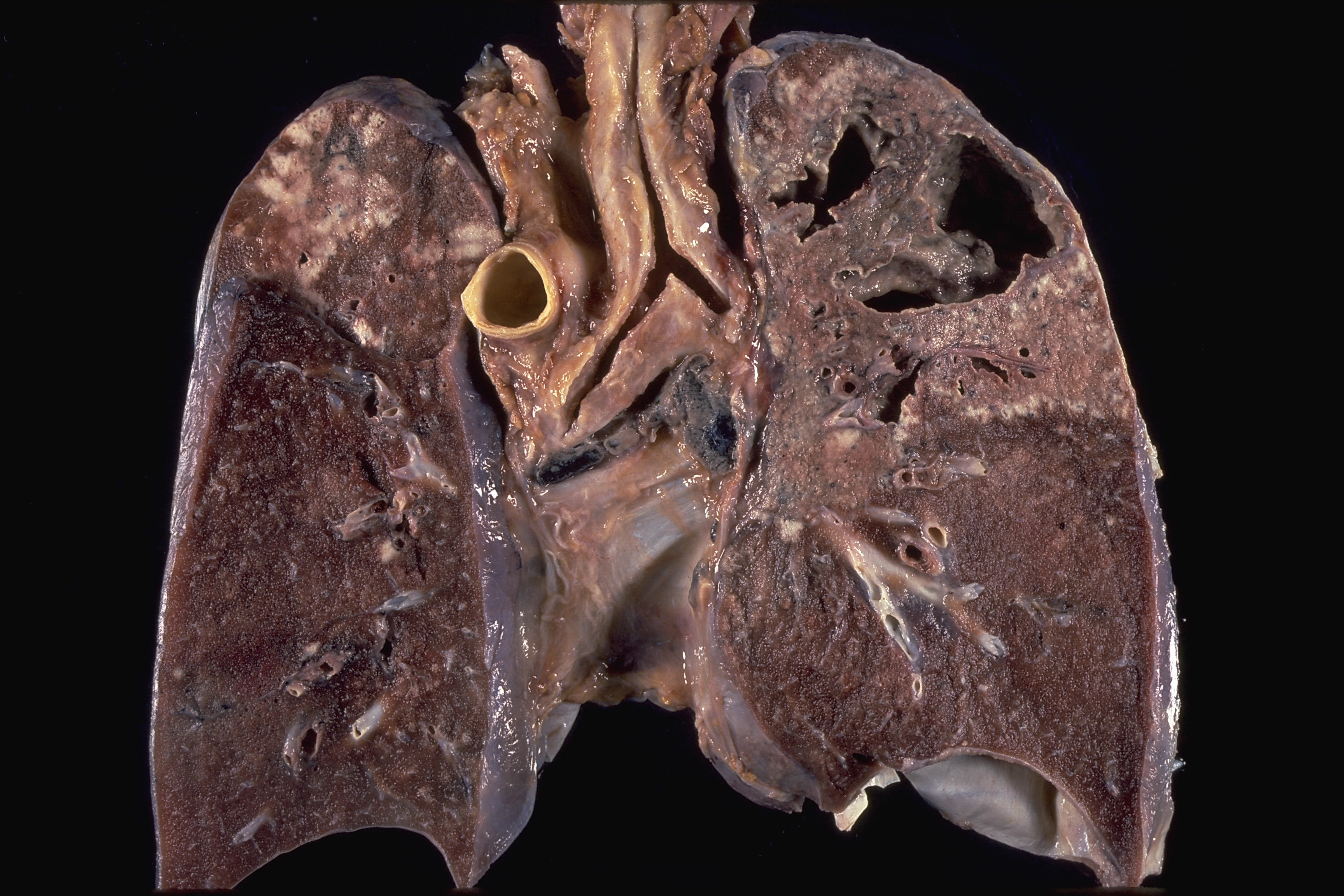
M. tuberculosis in the lungs, showing large cavities the bacteria have dissolved

Mycobacterium tuberculosis (M. tb), also known as Koch's bacillus, is a species of pathogenic bacteria in the family Mycobacteriaceae and the causative agent of tuberculosis.

First discovered in 1882 by Robert Koch, M. tuberculosis has an unusual, waxy coating on its cell surface primarily due to the presence of mycolic acid. This coating makes the cells impervious to Gram staining, and as a result, M. tuberculosis can appear weakly Gram-positive. Acid-fast stains such as Ziehl–Neelsen, or fluorescent stains such as auramine are used instead to identify M. tuberculosis with a microscope. The physiology of M. tuberculosis is highly aerobic and requires high levels of oxygen. Primarily a pathogen of the mammalian respiratory system, it infects the lungs. The most frequently used diagnostic methods for tuberculosis are the tuberculin skin test, acid-fast stain, culture, and polymerase chain reaction.

The M. tuberculosis genome was sequenced in 1998.

== Microbiology ==
M. tuberculosis requires oxygen to grow, and is nonmotile. It divides every 18–24 hours. This is extremely slow compared with other bacteria, which tend to have division times measured in minutes (Escherichia coli can divide roughly every 20 minutes). It is a small bacillus that can withstand weak disinfectants and can survive in a dry state for weeks. Its unusual cell wall, rich in lipids such as mycolic acid and cord factor glycolipid, is likely responsible for its resistance to desiccation and is a key virulence factor.

=== Microscopy ===
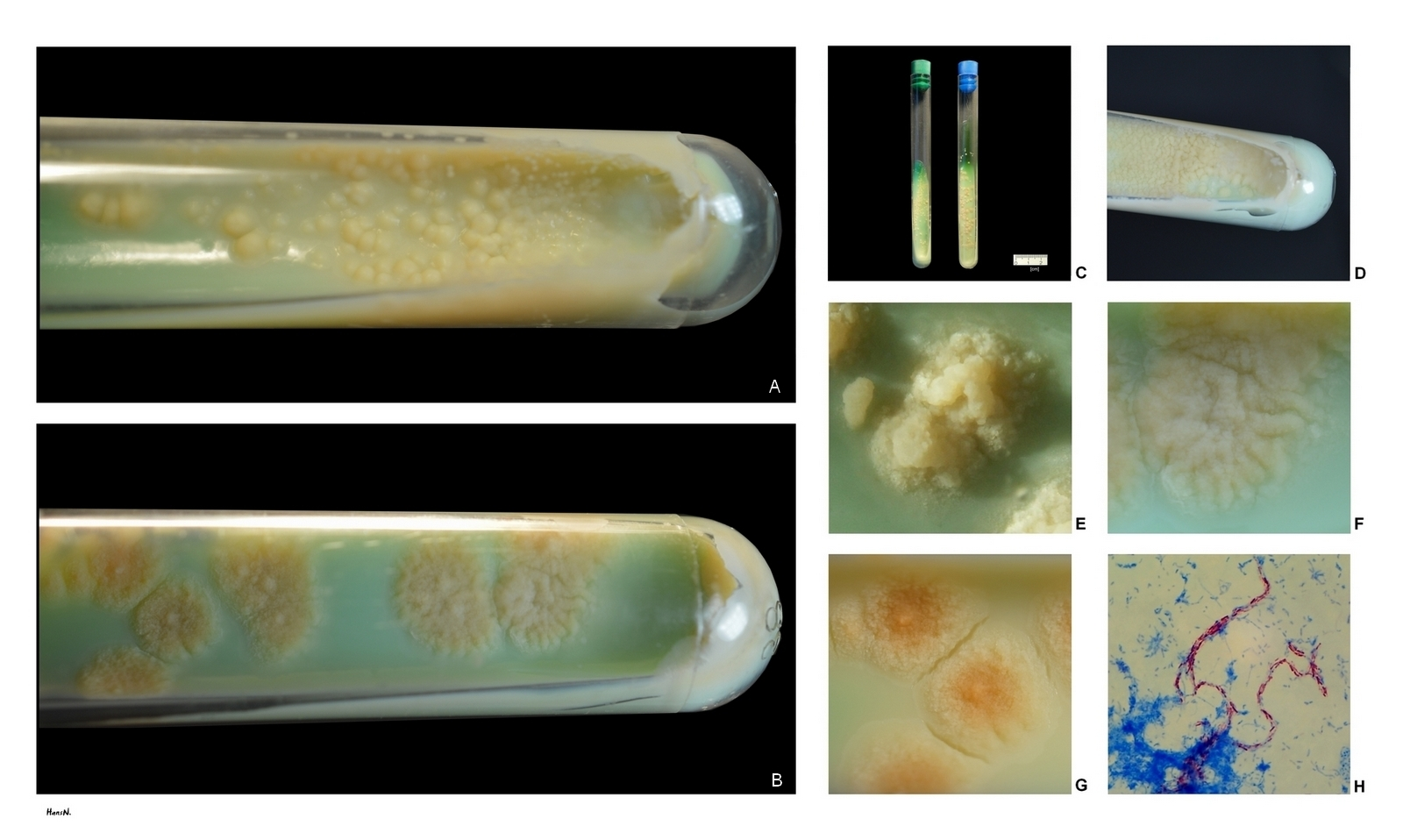
Growth of Mycobacterium tuberculosis on Löwenstein-Jensen (A) and Ogawa medium (B), after six weeks at 37°C.

Other bacteria are commonly identified with a microscope by staining them with Gram stain. However, the mycolic acid in the cell wall of M. tuberculosis does not absorb the stain. Instead, acid-fast stains such as Ziehl–Neelsen stain, or fluorescent stains such as auramine are used. Cells are curved rod-shaped and are often seen wrapped together, due to the presence of fatty acids in the cell wall that stick together. This appearance is referred to as cording, like strands of cord that make up a rope. M. tuberculosis is characterized in tissue by caseating granulomas containing Langhans giant cells, which have a "horseshoe" pattern of nuclei.

=== Culture ===
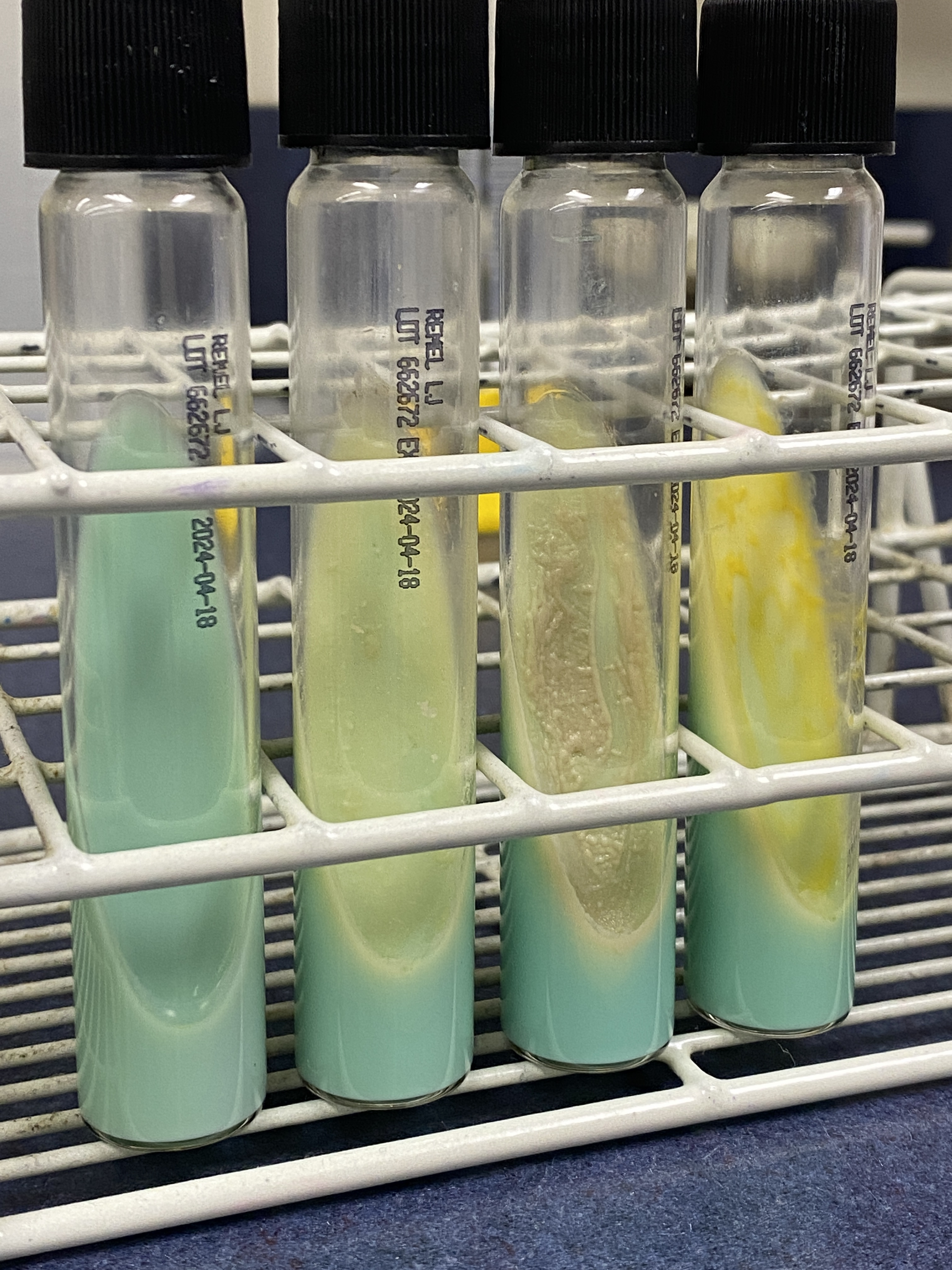
Slant tubes of Löwenstein-Jensen medium. From left to right: Negative control; M. tuberculosis: Dry-appearing colonies; Mycobacterium avium complex: Wet-appearing colonies; M. gordonae: Yellowish colonies

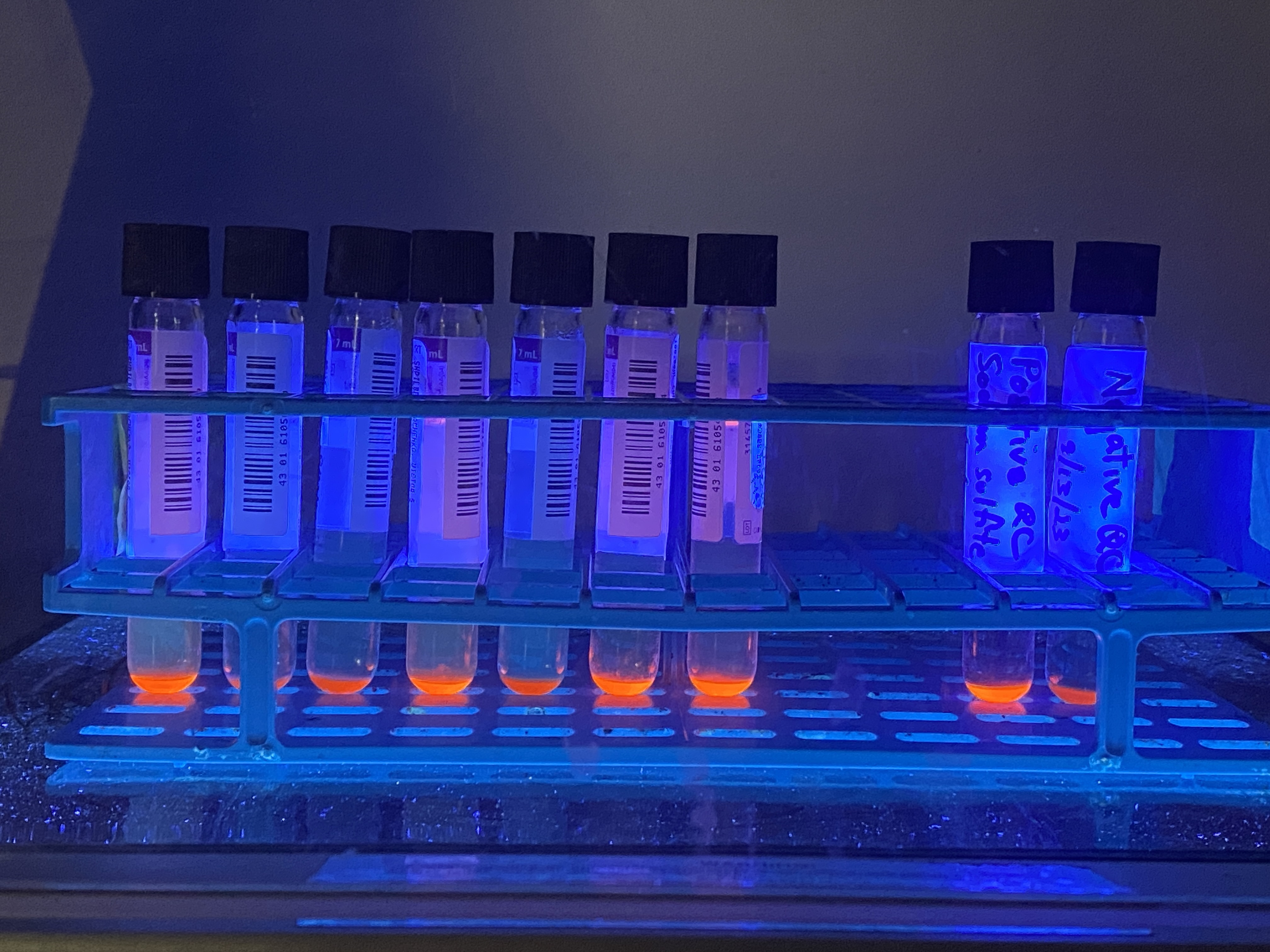
Mycobacteria growth indicator tube samples emitting fluorescence in ultraviolet light

M. tuberculosis can be grown in the laboratory. Compared to other commonly studied bacteria, M. tuberculosis has a remarkably slow growth rate, doubling roughly once per day. Commonly used media include liquids such as Middlebrook 7H9 or 7H12, egg-based solid media such as Lowenstein-Jensen, and solid agar-based such as Middlebrook 7H11 or 7H10. Visible colonies require several weeks to grow on agar plates. Mycobacteria growth indicator tubes can contain a gel that emits fluorescent light if mycobacteria are grown. It is distinguished from other mycobacteria by its production of catalase and niacin. Other tests to confirm its identity include gene probes and MALDI-TOF.

=== Morphology ===
Analysis of Mycobacterium tuberculosis via scanning electron microscope shows the bacteria are 2.71±1.05 μm in length with an average diameter of 0.345±0.029 μm. The outer membrane and plasma membrane surface areas were measured to be 3.04±1.33 μm^{2} and 2.67±1.19 μm^{2}, respectively. The cell, outer membrane, periplasm, plasma membrane, and cytoplasm volumes were 0.293±0.113 fl (= μm^{3}), 0.006±0.003 fl, 0.060±0.021 fl, 0.019±0.008 fl, and 0.210±0.091 fl, respectively. The average total ribosome number was 1672±568 with ribosome density about 716.5±171.4/(0.1 fl).

M. tb morphology summary
Feature	Magnitude
Length	2.71 ± 1.05μm
Outer membrane surface area	3.04 ± 1.33 μm^{2}
Cell volume	0.293 ± 0.113 fl (= μm^{3})

=== Related Mycobacterium species ===
M. tuberculosis is part of a genetically related group of Mycobacterium species that has at least nine members:

- M. tuberculosis sensu stricto
- M. africanum
- M. canettii
- M. bovis
- M. caprae
- M. microti
- M. pinnipedii
- M. mungi
- M. orygis

== Pathophysiology ==
Humans are the only known reservoirs of M. tuberculosis. A misconception is that M. tuberculosis can be spread by shaking hands, making contact with toilet seats, sharing food or drink, or sharing toothbrushes. However, major spread is through air droplets originating from a person who has the disease either coughing, sneezing, speaking, or singing.

When in the lungs, M. tuberculosis is phagocytosed by alveolar macrophages, but they are unable to kill and digest the bacterium. Its cell wall is made of cord factor glycolipids that inhibit the fusion of the phagosome with the lysosome, which contains a host of antibacterial factors.

Specifically, M. tuberculosis blocks the bridging molecule, early endosomal autoantigen 1 (EEA1); however, this blockade does not prevent fusion of vesicles filled with nutrients. In addition, production of the diterpene isotuberculosinol prevents maturation of the phagosome. The bacteria also evades macrophage-killing by neutralizing reactive nitrogen intermediates. More recently, M. tuberculosis has been shown to secrete and cover itself in 1-tuberculosinyladenosine (1-TbAd), a special nucleoside that acts as an antacid, allowing it to neutralize pH and induce swelling in lysosomes.

In M. tuberculosis infections, PPM1A levels were found to be upregulated, and this, in turn, would impact the normal apoptotic response of macrophages to clear pathogens, as PPM1A is involved in the intrinsic and extrinsic apoptotic pathways. Hence, when PPM1A levels were increased, the expression of it inhibits the two apoptotic pathways. With kinome analysis, the JNK/AP-1 signalling pathway was found to be a downstream effector that PPM1A has a part to play in, and the apoptotic pathway in macrophages are controlled in this manner. As a result of having apoptosis being suppressed, it provides M. tuberculosis with a safe replicative niche, and so the bacteria are able to maintain a latent state for a prolonged time.

Granulomas, organized aggregates of immune cells, are a hallmark feature of tuberculosis infection. Granulomas play dual roles during infection: they regulate the immune response and minimize tissue damage, but also can aid in the expansion of infection.

The ability to construct M. tuberculosis mutants and test individual gene products for specific functions has significantly advanced the understanding of its pathogenesis and virulence factors. Many secreted and exported proteins are known to be important in pathogenesis. For example, one such virulence factor is cord factor (trehalose dimycolate), which serves to increase survival within its host. Resistant strains of M. tuberculosis have developed resistance to more than one TB drug, due to mutations in their genes. In addition, pre-existing first-line TB drugs such as rifampicin and streptomycin have decreased efficiency in clearing intracellular M. tuberculosis due to their inability to effectively penetrate the macrophage niche.

JNK plays a key role in the control of apoptotic pathways—intrinsic and extrinsic. In addition, it is also found to be a substrate of PPM1A activity, hence the phosphorylation of JNK would cause apoptosis to occur. Since PPM1A levels are elevated during M. tuberculosis infections, by inhibiting the PPM1A signalling pathways, it could potentially be a therapeutic method to kill M. tuberculosis-infected macrophages by restoring its normal apoptotic function in defence of pathogens. By targeting the PPM1A-JNK signalling axis pathway, then, it could eliminate M. tuberculosis-infected macrophages.

The ability to restore macrophage apoptosis to M. tuberculosis-infected ones could improve the current tuberculosis chemotherapy treatment, as TB drugs can gain better access to the bacteria in the niche. thus decreasing the treatment times for M. tuberculosis infections.

Symptoms of M. tuberculosis include coughing that lasts for more than three weeks, hemoptysis, chest pain when breathing or coughing, weight loss, fatigue, fever, night sweats, chills, and loss of appetite. M. tuberculosis also has the potential of spreading to other parts of the body. This can cause blood in urine if the kidneys are affected, and back pain if the spine is affected.

=== Strain variation ===
Typing of strains is useful in the investigation of tuberculosis outbreaks, because it gives the investigator evidence for or against transmission from person to person. Consider the situation where person A has tuberculosis and believes he acquired it from person B. If the bacteria isolated from each person belong to different types, then transmission from B to A is definitively disproven; however, if the bacteria are the same strain, then this supports (but does not definitively prove) the hypothesis that B infected A.

Until the early 2000s, M. tuberculosis strains were typed by pulsed field gel electrophoresis. This has now been superseded by variable numbers of tandem repeats (VNTR), which is technically easier to perform and allows better discrimination between strains. This method makes use of the presence of repeated DNA sequences within the M. tuberculosis genome.

Three generations of VNTR typing for M. tuberculosis are noted. The first scheme, called exact tandem repeat, used only five loci, but the resolution afforded by these five loci was not as good as PFGE. The second scheme, called mycobacterial interspersed repetitive unit, had discrimination as good as PFGE. The third generation (mycobacterial interspersed repetitive unit – 2) added a further nine loci to bring the total to 24. This provides a degree of resolution greater than PFGE and is currently the standard for typing M. tuberculosis. However, with regard to archaeological remains, additional evidence may be required because of possible contamination from related soil bacteria.

Antibiotic resistance in M. tuberculosis typically occurs due to either the accumulation of mutations in the genes targeted by the antibiotic or a change in titration of the drug. M. tuberculosis is considered to be multidrug-resistant (MDR TB) if it has developed drug resistance to both rifampicin and isoniazid, which are the most important antibiotics used in treatment. Additionally, extensively drug-resistant M. tuberculosis (XDR TB) is characterized by resistance to both isoniazid and rifampin, plus any fluoroquinolone and at least one of three injectable second-line drugs (i.e., amikacin, kanamycin, or capreomycin).

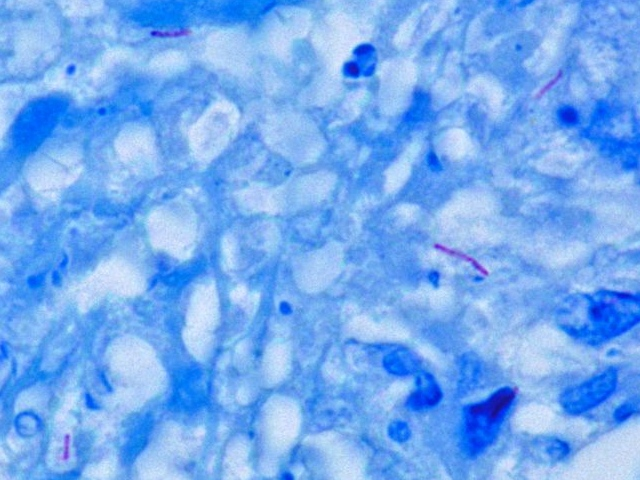
M. tuberculosis (stained red) in tissue (blue)

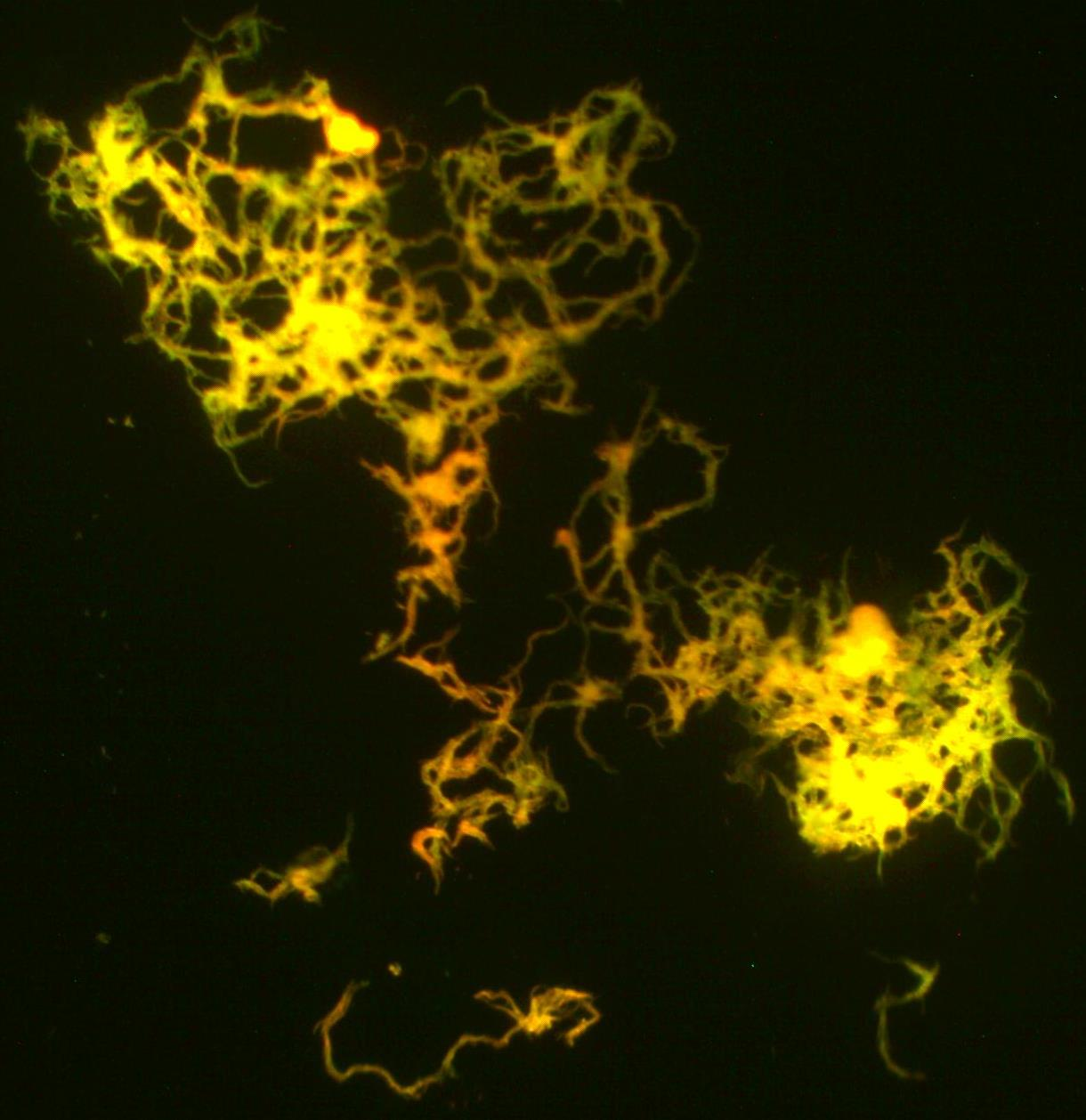
Cording M. tuberculosis (H37Rv strain) culture on the luminescent microscopy

== Genome ==
The genome of the H37Rv strain was published in 1998. Its size is 4 million base pairs, with 3,959 genes; 40% of these genes have had their function characterized, with possible function postulated for another 44%. Within the genome are also six pseudogenes.

Fatty acid metabolism. The genome contains 250 genes involved in fatty acid metabolism, with 39 of these involved in the polyketide metabolism generating the waxy coat. Such large numbers of conserved genes show the evolutionary importance of the waxy coat to pathogen survival. Furthermore, experimental studies have since validated the importance of a lipid metabolism for M. tuberculosis, consisting entirely of host-derived lipids such as fats and cholesterol. Bacteria isolated from the lungs of infected mice were shown to preferentially use fatty acids over carbohydrate substrates. M. tuberculosis can also grow on the lipid cholesterol as a sole source of carbon, and genes involved in the cholesterol use pathway(s) have been validated as important during various stages of the infection lifecycle of M. tuberculosis, especially during the chronic phase of infection when other nutrients are likely not available.

PE/PPE gene families. About 10% of the coding capacity is taken up by the PE/PPE gene families that encode acidic, glycine-rich proteins. These proteins have a conserved N-terminal motif, deletion of which impairs growth in macrophages and granulomas.

Noncoding RNAs. Nine noncoding sRNAs have been characterised in M. tuberculosis, with a further 56 predicted in a bioinformatics screen.

Antibiotic resistance genes. In 2013, a study on the genome of several sensitive, ultraresistant, and multiresistant M. tuberculosis strains was made to study antibiotic resistance mechanisms. Results reveal new relationships and drug resistance genes not previously associated and suggest some genes and intergenic regions associated with drug resistance may be involved in the resistance to more than one drug. Noteworthy is the role of the intergenic regions in the development of this resistance, and most of the genes proposed in this study to be responsible for drug resistance have an essential role in the development of M. tuberculosis. Most recent research conducted on Mycobaterium smegmatis suggests that, contrary to the traditional model of rapid genetic mutation, mycobacteria maintain high genomic stability under antibiotic pressure, relying instead on phenotypic tolerance and DNA-repair mechanisms for survival.

Epigenome. Single-molecule real-time sequencing and subsequent bioinformatic analysis has identified three DNA methyltransferases in M. tuberculosis, Mycobacterial Adenine Methyltransferases A (MamA), B (MamB), and C (MamC). All three are adenine methyltransferases, and each are functional in some clinical strains of M. tuberculosisand not in others. Unlike DNA methyltransferases in most bacteria, which invariably methylate the adenines at their targeted sequence, some strains of M. tuberculosis carry mutations in MamA that cause partial methylation of targeted adenine bases. This occurs as intracellular stochastic methylation, where some targeted adenine bases on a given DNA molecule are methylated while others remain unmethylated. MamA mutations causing intercellular mosaic methylation are most common in the globally successful Beijing sublineage of M. tuberculosis. Due to the influence of methylation on gene expression at some locations in the genome, it has been hypothesized that IMM may give rise to phenotypic diversity, and partially responsible for the global success of Beijing sublineage.

== Evolution ==
The Mycobacterium tuberculosis complex (MTBC) evolved in Africa and most probably in the Horn of Africa. In addition to M. tuberculosis, the MTBC has a number of members infecting various animal species, including M. africanum, M. bovis (Dassie's bacillus), M. caprae, M. microti, M. mungi, M. orygis, and M. pinnipedii. This group may also include the M. canettii clade. These animal strains of MTBC do not strictly deserve species status, as they are all closely related and embedded in the M. tuberculosis phylogeny, but for historic reasons, they currently hold species status.

The M. canettii clade – which includes M. prototuberculosis – is a group of smooth-colony Mycobacterium species. Unlike the established members of the M. tuberculosis group, they undergo recombination with other species. The majority of the known strains of this group have been isolated from the Horn of Africa. The ancestor of M. tuberculosis appears to be M. canettii, first described in 1969.

The established members of the M. tuberculosis complex are all clonal in their spread. The main human-infecting species have been classified into seven lineages. Translating these lineages into the terminology used for spoligotyping, a very crude genotyping methodology, lineage 1 contains the East African-Indian (EAI), the Manila family of strains and some Manu (Indian) strains; lineage 2 is the Beijing group; lineage 3 includes the Central Asian (CAS) strains; lineage 4 includes the Ghana and Haarlem (H/T), Latin America-Mediterranean (LAM) and X strains; types 5 and 6 correspond to M. africanum and are observed predominantly and at high frequencies in West Africa. A seventh type has been isolated from the Horn of Africa. The other species of this complex belong to a number of spoligotypes and do not normally infect humans.

Lineages 2, 3 and 4 all share a unique deletion event (tbD1) and thus form a monophyletic group. Types 5 and 6 are closely related to the animal strains of MTBC, which do not normally infect humans. Lineage 3 has been divided into two clades: CAS-Kili (found in Tanzania) and CAS-Delhi (found in India and Saudi Arabia).

Lineage 4 is also known as the Euro-American lineage. Subtypes within this type include Latin American Mediterranean, Uganda I, Uganda II, Haarlem, X, and Congo.

A much cited study reported that M. tuberculosis has co-evolved with human populations, and that the most recent common ancestor of the M. tuberculosis complex evolved between 40,000 and 70,000 years ago. However, a later study that included genome sequences from M. tuberculosis complex members extracted from three 1,000-year-old Peruvian mummies, came to quite different conclusions. If the most recent common ancestor of the M. tuberculosis complex were 40,000 to 70,000 years old, this would necessitate an evolutionary rate much lower than any estimates produced by genomic analyses of heterochronous samples, suggesting a far more recent common ancestor of the M. tuberculosis complex as little as 6000 years ago.

An analysis of over 3000 strains of M. bovis from 35 countries suggested an Africa origin for this species.

=== Co-evolution with modern humans ===
There are currently two narratives existing in parallel regarding the age of MTBC and how it has spread and co-evolved with humans through time. One study compared the M. tuberculosis phylogeny to a human mitochondrial genome phylogeny and interpreted these as being highly similar. Based on this, the study suggested that M. tuberculosis, like humans, evolved in Africa and subsequently spread with anatomically modern humans out of Africa across the world. By calibrating the mutation rate of M. tuberculosis to match this narrative, the study suggested that MTBC evolved 40,000–70,000 years ago. Applying this time scale, the study found that the M. tuberculosis effective population size expanded during the Neolithic Demographic Transition (around 10,000 years ago) and suggested that M. tuberculosis was able to adapt to changing human populations and that the historical success of this pathogen was driven at least in part by dramatic increases in human host population density. It has also been demonstrated that after emigrating from one continent to another, a human host's region of origin is predictive of which TB lineage they carry, which could reflect either a stable association between host populations and specific M. tuberculosis lineages and/or social interactions that are shaped by shared cultural and geographic histories.

Regarding the congruence between human and M. tuberculosis phylogenies, a study relying on M. tuberculosis and human Y chromosome DNA sequences to formally assess the correlation between them, concluded that they are not congruent. Also, a more recent study which included genome sequences from M. tuberculosis complex members extracted from three 1,000-year-old Peruvian mummies, estimated that the most recent common ancestor of the M. tuberculosis complex lived only 4,000 – 6,000 years ago. The M. tuberculosis evolutionary rate estimated by the Bos et al. study is also supported by a study on Lineage 4 relying on genomic aDNA sequences from Hungarian mummies more than 200 years old. In total, the evidence thus favors this more recent estimate of the age of the MTBC most recent common ancestor, and thus that the global evolution and dispersal of M. tuberculosis has occurred over the last 4,000–6,000 years.

Among the seven recognized lineages of M. tuberculosis, only two are truly global in their distribution: Lineages 2 and 4. Among these, Lineage 4 is the most well dispersed, and almost totally dominates in the Americas. Lineage 4 was shown to have evolved in or in the vicinity of Europe, and to have spread globally with Europeans starting around the 13th century. This study also found that Lineage 4 tuberculosis spread to the Americas shortly after the European discovery of the continent in 1492, and suggests that this represented the first introduction of human TB on the continent (although animal strains have been found in human remains predating Columbus. Similarly, Lineage 4 was found to have spread from Europe to Africa during the Age of Discovery, starting in the early 15th century.

It has been suggested that ancestral mycobacteria may have infected early hominids in East Africa as early as three million years ago.

DNA fragments from M. tuberculosis and tuberculosis disease indications were present in human bodies dating from 7000 BC found at Atlit-Yam in the Levant.

== Antibiotic resistance (ABR) ==
M. tuberculosis is a clonal organism and does not exchange DNA via horizontal gene transfer. Despite an additionally slow evolution rate, the emergence and spread of antibiotic resistance in M. tuberculosis poses an increasing threat to global public health. In 2019, the WHO reported the estimated incidence of antibiotic resistant TB to be 3.4% in new cases, and 18% in previously treated cases. Geographical discrepancies exist in the incidence rates of drug-resistant TB. Countries facing the highest rates of antibiotic resistant TB include China, India, Russia, and South Africa. Recent trends reveal an increase in drug-resistant cases in a number of regions, with Papua New Guinea, Singapore, and Australia undergoing significant increases.

Multidrug-resistant tuberculosis (MDR-TB) is characterised by resistance to at least the two front-line drugs isoniazid and rifampin. MDR is associated with a relatively poor treatment success rate of 52%. Isoniazid and rifampin resistance are tightly linked, with 78% of the reported rifampin-resistant TB cases in 2019 being resistant to isoniazid as well. Rifampin-resistance is primarily due to resistance-conferring mutations in the rifampin-resistance determining region (RRDR) within the rpoB gene. The most frequently observed mutations of the codons in RRDR are 531, 526 and 516. However, alternative more elusive resistance-conferring mutations have been detected. Isoniazid function occurs through the inhibition of mycolic acid synthesis through the NADH-dependent enoyl-acyl carrier protein (ACP)-reductase. This is encoded by the inhA gene. As a result, isoniazid resistance is primarily due to mutations within inhA and the katG gene or its promoter region - a catalase-peroxidase which is required to activate isoniazid. As MDR in M. tuberculosis becomes increasingly common, the emergence of pre-extensively drug resistant (pre-XDR) and extensively drug resistant (XDR-) TB threatens to exacerbate the public health crisis. XDR-TB is characterised by resistance to both rifampin and Isoniazid, as well second-line fluoroquinolones and at least one additional front-line drug. Thus, the development of alternative therapeutic measures is of utmost priority.

An intrinsic contributor to the antibiotic resistant nature of M. tuberculosis is its unique cell wall. Saturated with long-chain fatty acids or mycolic acids, the mycobacterial cell presents a robust, relatively insoluble barrier. This has led to its synthesis being the target of many antibiotics - such as Isoniazid. However, resistance has emerged to the majority of them. A novel, promising therapeutic target is mycobacterial membrane protein large 3 (MmpL3). The mycobacterial membrane protein large (MmpL) proteins are transmembrane proteins which play a key role in the synthesis of the cell wall and the transport of the associated lipids. Of these, MmpL3 is essential; knock-out of which has been shown to be bactericidal. Due to its essential nature, MmpL3 inhibitors show promise as alternative therapeutic measures in the age of antibiotic resistance. Inhibition of MmpL3 function showed an inability to transport trehalose monomycolate - an essential cell wall lipid - across the plasma membrane. The recently reported structure of MmpL3 revealed resistance-conferring mutations to associate primarily with the transmembrane domain. Although resistance to pre-clinical MmpL3 inhibitors has been detected, analysis of the widespread mutational landscape revealed a low level of environmental resistance. This suggests that MmpL3 inhibitors currently undergoing clinical trials would face little resistance if made available. Additionally, the ability of many MmpL3 inhibitors to work synergistically with other antitubercular drugs presents a ray of hope in combatting the TB crisis. Genome modeling of M. tuberculosis has also highlighted potential synthetic lethal interactions that could inform new therapeutic strategies. Specifically, knock-out of the gene Rv0489 has been shown to render gene Rv2156c essential. Given that Rv2156c is involved in peptidoglycan synthesis, this synthetic lethality could be exploited to sensitize M. tuberculosis to β-lactam antibiotics, which typically target cell wall synthesis. This opens up the possibility of repurposing existing β-lactam drugs as part of combination therapies to more effectively treat resistant tuberculosis strains.

Another cause for M. tuberculosis drug resistance are efflux pumps that can be found in many bacteria. Efflux pumps are used by the bacteria for some endogenous functions, for example lipid transport from the inner- to the outer membrane, but also as a way of reducing the drug concentration inside the cell. The EfpA efflux pump that can be found in M. tuberculosis is a part of the major facilitator superfamily (MFS). In M. tuberculosis the EfpA transports endogenous lipids and possibly drugs via a staircase-flips model from the inner to the outer membrane. This mechanism is a possible drug target, as inhibition of it leads to the death of the bacteria, seemingly mostly by blocking its endogenous functions.

== Host genetics ==
The nature of the host-pathogen interaction between humans and M. tuberculosis is considered to have a genetic component. A group of rare disorders called Mendelian susceptibility to mycobacterial diseases was observed in a subset of individuals with a genetic defect that results in increased susceptibility to mycobacterial infection.

Early case and twin studies have indicated that genetic components are important in host susceptibility to M. tuberculosis. Recent genome-wide association studies (GWAS) have identified three genetic risk loci, including at positions 11p13 and 18q11. As is common in GWAS, the variants discovered have moderate effect sizes.

== Incubation period ==
The incubation period refers to the time between infection with Mycobacterium tuberculosis and the development of signs or symptoms of tuberculosis (TB). However, TB differs from many infectious diseases because infection does not necessarily result in immediate illness.

Following infection, the immune system typically requires approximately 2–8 weeks to develop a response that can be detected by tuberculosis tests, such as the tuberculin skin test (TST) or interferon-gamma release assay (IGRA). This period is more accurately referred to as the window period for TB testing. Testing during this period may produce a negative result even when infection has occurred because the immune response may not yet be detectable.

The development of active TB disease is different. A person may develop active disease weeks, months, or even decades after the initial infection. Many infected individuals instead develop latent TB infection, in which M. tuberculosis remains in the body without causing symptoms.

== DNA repair ==
As an intracellular pathogen, M. tuberculosis is exposed to a variety of DNA-damaging assaults, primarily from host-generated antimicrobial toxic radicals. Exposure to reactive oxygen species and/or reactive nitrogen species causes different types of DNA damage including oxidation, depurination, methylation, and deamination that can give rise to single- and double-strand breaks (DSBs).

DnaE2 polymerase is upregulated in M. tuberculosis by several DNA-damaging agents, as well as during infection of mice. Loss of this DNA polymerase reduces the virulence of M. tuberculosis in mice. DnaE2 is an error-prone DNA repair polymerase that appears to contribute to M. tuberculosis survival during infection.

The two major pathways employed in repair of DSBs are homologous recombinational repair (HR) and nonhomologous end joining (NHEJ). Macrophage-internalized M. tuberculosis is able to persist if either of these pathways is defective, but is attenuated when both pathways are defective. This indicates that intracellular exposure of M. tuberculosis to reactive oxygen and/or reactive nitrogen species results in the formation of DSBs that are repaired by HR or NHEJ. However deficiency of DSB repair does not appear to impair M. tuberculosis virulence in animal models.

== History ==
M. tuberculosis, then known as the "tubercle bacillus", was first described on 24 March 1882 by Robert Koch, who subsequently received the Nobel Prize in Physiology or Medicine for this discovery in 1905; the bacterium is also known as "Koch's bacillus".

M. tuberculosis has existed throughout history, but the name has changed frequently over time. In 1720, though, the history of tuberculosis started to take shape into what is known of it today; as the physician Benjamin Marten described in his A Theory of Consumption, tuberculosis may be caused by small living creatures transmitted through the air to other patients.

More than 100 million people around the world have died from being infected with Mycobacterium tuberculosis due to unavailability of the vaccine in some parts of the world.

According to data published by the World Health Organisation, the global estimated incidence of infection by M. tuberculosis has decreased from 169 to 131 cases per 100,000 people from 2010 to 2024, with a slight increase to 134 between 2021 and 2022 (likely related to the Covid-19 pandemic). Estimated total deaths show a similar decline within the same time period, from around 2.1 million to 1.2 million, with the same minor spike between 2021 and 2022.

== Vaccine ==
The BCG vaccine (bacille Calmette-Guerin) - a live-attenuated strain of Mycobacterium bovis, while effective against childhood and severe forms of tuberculosis, has limited success in preventing the most common form of the disease today, adult pulmonary tuberculosis. Because of this, it is primarily used in high tuberculosis incidence regions, and is not a recommended vaccine in the United States due to the low risk of infection. To receive this vaccine in the United States, an individual is required to go through a consultation process with an expert in M. tuberculosis and is only given to those who meet the specific criteria.

Administration of the BCG vaccine has been shown to induce so called "trained immunity", which refers to the enhanced response of the innate immune system. Unlike adaptive immunity, trained immunity involves long-lasting changes in innate immune cells like monocytes and macrophages, which become more responsive to infections. These changes occur through epigenetic reprogramming, such as histone modifications, leading to increased production of pro-inflammatory cytokines.

Research indicates there may be a correlation between BCG vaccination and better immune response to COVID-19. The DNA vaccine can be used alone or in combination with BCG. DNA vaccines have enough potential to be used with TB treatment and reduce the treatment time in future.

MTBVAC is the only live-attenuated Mycobacterium tuberculosis vaccine that is currently in development. It is derived from human M.tb and uses a weakened harmless form of the pathogen to create an immune response in the host.

Current ongoing research shows that MTBVAC is just as safe as BCG, while being more immunogenic and protective. Since 2013 this vaccine has passed four clinical trials in infants, adolescents, and adults.

== See also ==
- Philip D'Arcy Hart
