= Tuberculosinyl diphosphate diphosphohydrolase =

Tuberculosinyl diphosphate diphosphohydrolase may refer to:

- Tuberculosinol synthase, an enzyme
- Isotuberculosinol synthase, an enzyme
