= C20H34O =

The molecular formula C_{20}H_{34}O (molar mass: 290.48 g/mol, exact mass: 290.2610 u) may refer to:

- Cembratrienol (CBTol)
- Geranylgeraniol
- Geranyl-linalool
- Isotuberculosinol, also known as nosyberkol or edaxadiene
