= Dorothy Yeboah-Manu =

Microbiologist

- Education: London School of Hygiene & Tropical Medicine; Swiss Tropical and Public Health Institute
- Awards: Royal Society Africa Prize 2018
- Scientific career
- Workplaces: University of Ghana; Noguchi Memorial Institute for Medical Research

Dorothy Yeboah-Manu is a microbiologist and Professor at the Noguchi Memorial Institute for Medical Research at the University of Ghana. She studies host and pathogen interactions and epidemiology. She won the 2018 Royal Society Africa Prize.

== Early life and education ==
Yeboah-Manu is from Akyem Abuakwa. She had her secondary school education at Ofori Panin Secondary School at New Tafo She completed a master's degree in Applied Molecular Biology of Infectious Diseases at the London School of Hygiene & Tropical Medicine.

== Research and career ==
Yeboah-Manu joined the Noguchi Memorial Institute for Medical Research as a Research Assistant in 1993. She studied the safety of street food in Ghana. They found mesophilic bacteria in 69.7% of foods, including the staple foods fufu and omo tuo. Yeboah-Manu was the first to describe polymorphism in the mycobacterium ulcerans from an African country and provide evidence to restrict Mycobacterium africanum to West Africa. She completed a PhD in medical parasitology and infection biology at the Swiss Tropical and Public Health Institute in 2006.

She was awarded a five-year Wellcome Trust fellowship in 2012, allowing her to work on mycobacterium tuberculosis. She investigated the genomic diversity and differing profiles of gene expression between mycobacterium africanum and mycobacterium tuberculosis. She is concerned about the fast spread of tuberculosis in Ghana's urban areas.

She is on the National Faculty of the World Bank Centre of Excellence funded West African Centre for Cell Biology of Infectious Pathogens. She is a member of the boards of the International Union Against Tuberculosis and Lung Disease, the World Health Organization Global Network of Laboratories Confirming Mycobacterium ulcerans Infection and the National Buruli Ulcer Control Program. She is chair of the advisory board of the National Tuberculosis Program. She is Vice President of the Immunological Society of Ghana.

She has contributed to two books: Towards Effective Disease Control in Ghana: Research and Policy Implications Volume 1, Malaria and Volume 2, Other Infectious Diseases and Health Systems. She won the 2018 Royal Society Africa Prize.

== Honours ==
- Order of the Rising Sun, 3rd Class, Gold Rays with Neck Ribbon (2026)
