= Makani =

Makani may refer to:

== People ==
Makani is a surname. Notable people with the surname include:

- Julie Makani (born 1970), Tanzanian medical researcher
- Lévy Makani, Congolese politician
- Ramo Makani (born 1960), Tanzanian politician
- Sosha Makani (born 1986), Iranian footballer
- Firdaws Makani (1483 — 1530), posthumous name of Emperor Babur, founder of Mughal Empire
- Mariam Makani (1527 — 1604), consort of Emperor Humayun and mother of Emperor Akbar
- Jannat Makani (1569 — 1627), posthumous name of Mughal Emperor Jahangir.
- Bilqis Makani (1573 — 1619), posthumous name of the consort of Emperor Jahangir and mother of Emperor Shah Jahan
- Khuld Makani (1618 — 1707), posthumous name of Mughal Emperor Alamgir (Aurangzeb)

== Other ==
- Makani (company), a wind-based energy company that is a subsidiary of Alphabet Inc.
- Makani Pahili or Hurricane Makani, both used to exercise Hawaiian emergency capabilities
