= Henry Mwandumba =

Malawian professor of medicine

Henry Charles Mwandumba
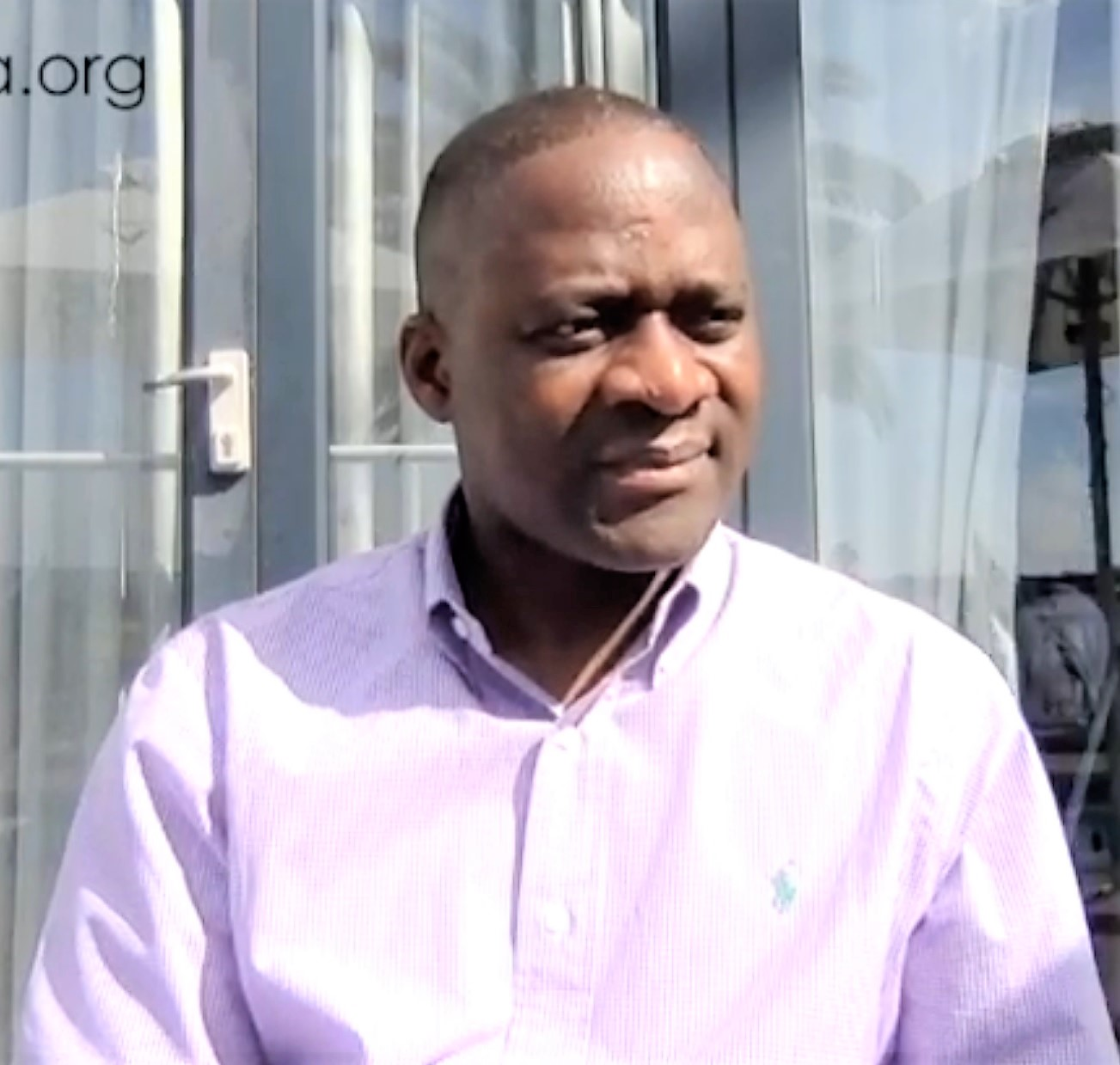
- Henry Mwandumba speaks to Immunopaedia in 2018
- Education: University of Zimbabwe
- Awards: Royal Society Africa Prize (2019)
- Scientific career
- Workplaces: University of Malawi College of Medicine; Royal Liverpool University Hospital; Liverpool School of Tropical Medicine

Henry Charles Mwandumba is a Malawian Professor of Medicine and the Director of the Malawi-Liverpool-Wellcome Programme. He works on the tuberculosis phagosome in the University of Malawi College of Medicine, and serves as President of the Federation of African Immunological Societies. In 2019 Mwandumba was awarded the Royal Society Africa Prize.

== Early life and education ==
Mwandumba studied medicine at the University of Zimbabwe, and graduated with a Bachelor of Medicine, Bachelor of Surgery in 1990. He specialised in general practice and infectious diseases in Liverpool.

== Research and career ==
Mwandumba is based in Blantyre. He works with the Wellcome Trust and Liverpool School of Tropical Medicine. He studies the impact of HIV and concurrent pulmonary infections, including Mycobacterium tuberculosis, on innate pulmonary immunity. In Sub-Saharan Africa, 80% of tuberculosis (TB) patients are co-infected with HIV, and TB is the leading cause of death in patients with HIV. The increased likelihood of suffering from TB at the same time as HIV implies that HIV changes the immune environment of the lung. Mwandumba looks to better understand the mechanisms behind susceptibility and resistance to TB in an effort to reduce the occurrence of HIV-associated TB. He is also involved with the development of new therapies for TB. Patients that take Antiretroviral Therapy (ART), a common treatment for HIV, are between 5 and 10 times more likely to also suffer from TB than non-HIV positive patients. Mwanduma has demonstrated that CD4+ T cells alone do not determine the risk of developing TB. He showed that it takes four years of Antiretroviral Therapy before patients with HIV achieve the same TB-specific immune response as patients without TB.

In particular, Mwandumba is interested in how TB pathogens impact the innate function of alveolar macrophage. Alveolar macrophages are differentiated immune cells that exist at the surface of the alveolar tissue and are involved in immunity against respiratory diseases. They exist in two distinct forms; small and large. Using flow cytometry, microscopy, and molecular biology, Mwandumba studies alveolar macrophages and how they function in patients with HIV. He was the first to demonstrate that Mycobacterium TB stopped the progression of the endosomal–lysosomal system; implying that the lungs of patients that suffer from both TB and HIV are low in antimicrobial cytokines. Mwandumba uses fluorescence in situ hybridization to monitor HIV infected alveolar macrophages, which involves fluorescent probes that bind to RNA that are related to HIV. He showed that small alveolar macrophages are more likely to be infected by HIV, implying they could be useful targets to improve pulmonary immunity.

He is also involved with work to improve the diagnosis and treatment of patients in Sub-Saharan Africa with chronic cough. In 2015 Mwandumba was a distinguished scholar at Cornell University, where he delivered a public lecture on healthcare in Malawi. He works as an honorary consultant at the Queen Elizabeth Central Hospital in Malawi as well as at the Royal Liverpool University Hospital. Mwandumba has been involved with the Royal College of Physicians Malawi-Liverpool-Wellcome Physicians for Africa programme. In 2017 Mwandumba was awarded a Medical Research Council African Leader Award. In 2018 he was made deputy director of the Malawi-Liverpool-Wellcome Trust (MLW) research program, where he leads the Mucosal Immunology Group. As of November 2019, Mwandumba is President of the Federation of African Immunological Societies.

In 2019 Mwandumba was awarded the Royal Society Africa Prize.
