= Pfizer Award (disambiguation) =

Pfizer Award is an annual award for the best book on the history of science, awarded by the History of Science Society

Pfizer Award, awards named Pfizer, may also refer to:

- Pfizer Award in Enzyme Chemistry, an award for chemists in enzyme chemistry who are under 40 years old, administered by the Division of Biological Chemistry of the American Chemical Society
- Royal Society Pfizer Award, awarded by the British Royal Society for Africa-based scientists in biological sciences
- Pfizer Human Rights Award, an award given by the Mexico City International Contemporary Film Festival (FICCO)
