= Marvin Whiteley =

American Microbiologist

- Education: University of Texas at Austin; Texas State University; University of Iowa
- Scientific career
- Fields: Microbiology
- Workplaces: Georgia Institute of Technology

Marvin Whiteley is an American microbiologist and professor at the Georgia Institute of Technology whose research focuses on intercellular bacterial communication and biofilm formation. He co-found SynthBiome, a biotechnology company that develops advanced infection model systems. Whiteley serves as the co-director of the Emory-Children's Cystic Fibrosis Center in Atlanta. Whiteley also is a Georgia Research Alliance Eminent Scholar and a Fellow of the American Academy of Microbiology.

== Early life and education ==
Marvin Whiteley received Bachelor of Science degree in zoology from the University of Texas at Austin in 1995. He then received a Master of Science in biology from Southwest Texas State University (now Texas State University) in 1997. Whiteley completed his Ph.D. in microbiology at the University of Iowa in 2001. His doctoral research, conducted under microbiologist E. P. Greenberg, focused on quorum sensing and biofilm development in the bacterium Pseudomonas aeruginosa.

== Career ==
Whiteley joined the faculty at the University of Oklahoma in 2002 as an assistant professor of microbiology. He then moved to the University of Texas at Austin in 2006 where he became a member of Molecular Genetics and Microbiology faculty. He was promoted from assistant professor to associate professor in 2009 and attained the rank of full professor in 2013, when he was also appointed as the first Director of UT Austin’s John Ring LaMontagne Center for Infectious Disease. During his tenure at UT Austin, Whiteley also held endowed positions as a fellow of the John Ring LaMontagne Chair in Infectious Diseases and Global Health (2013–2015) and the Mary M. Betzner Morrow Centennial Chair in Microbiology (2015–2017).

Whitely moved to the Georgia Institute of Technology as the Bennie H. & Nelson D. Abell Chair in Molecular and Cellular Biology and as a Georgia Research Alliance Eminent Scholar in 2017. At Georgia Tech, he founded and served as co-director of the Center for Microbial Dynamics and Infection from 2018-2020. He also serves as an adjunct professor in the Department of Pediatrics at Emory Medical School as well as the co-director of the Emory-Children's Cystic Fibrosis Center in Atlanta. In 2021, Whiteley co-founded SynthBiome Inc.

In 2025, he was named Editor-in-Chief of mBio.

== Research contributions ==
Whiteley's work focuses on the social behavior of bacteria and inter-microbe communication during chronic infection. Early work was on how the pathogen Pseudomonas aeruginosa packages its quorum-sensing signal Pseudomonas quinolone signal (PQS) into outer membrane vesicles (OMVs) to disseminate among cells. Whiteley also researched a biogenesis mechanism of OMVs by showing that PQS inserts itself into the outer membrane and expands the outer lipid leaflet to induce curvature (a "bilayer-couple" model).

Whiteley’s group also investigated mechanisms that control synergy (an increase in the ability of a pathogen to colonize/persist in a disease site and/or increase disease severity when co-infecting with other microbes) between bacterial species in both chronic and acute infections by examining polymicrobial infections found. Similarly, Whiteley investigated some synergistic relationships between bacterial can affect biogeography and antibiotic susceptibility.

Whiteley and his collaborator Dr. Jason Shear developed microfabricated picoliter-sized porous cavities that are able to confine a small number of cells referred to as bacterial “lobster traps" to study dense aggregates of biofilm bacteria in controlled spatial arrangements. Using these traps, their teams showed that clusters of as few as ~150 bacteria can develop biofilm-like traits, including heightened antibiotic tolerance and quorum-sensing activity, despite the low cell numbers.

Whiteley and his team characterized the PA transcriptome and developed a quantitative framework for evaluating how accurately laboratory infection models reproduce in vivo conditions. Whiteley and his group also developed a defined synthetic cystic fibrosis (CF) sputum medium (SCFM2).

== Honors ==
- Merck Irving S. Sigal Memorial Award (2008)
- Elected Fellow of the American Academy of Microbiology (2014)
- D.C. White award for Interdisciplinary Research, American Society for Microbiology (2026)
