= Mycobacterium shottsii =

Scientific classification
- Domain: Bacteria
- Kingdom: Bacillati
- Phylum: Actinomycetota
- Class: Actinomycetes
- Order: Mycobacteriales
- Family: Mycobacteriaceae
- Genus: Mycobacterium
- Species: M. shottsii

Binomial name
- Mycobacterium shottsii Rhodes, Kator, Kotob et al. 2003

Species of bacterium

Mycobacterium shottsii is a species of slow growing, rod-shaped bacterium from the family Mycobacteriaceae. The species was first isolated from striped bass (Morone saxatilis).

== Taxonomy ==
Mycobacterium shottsii was first isolated from striped bass with granulomatous disease in Chesapeake Bay. M. shottsii was validly described as a novel species of Mycobacterium in 2003 on the basis of 16S rRNA, growth, and phenotypic characteristics. The species was named after the American fish bacteriologist Emmett Shotts.

== Description ==
Mycobacterium shottsii grows on Middlebrook 7H10 agar. Due to its slow growth rate, colonies take 4 to 6 weeks to become visible. The species has an optimum growth temperature of 23 °C and is unable to grow at 37 °C.

M. shottsii is urease and niacin positive.
