= Geranyl-linalool =

Names
- IUPAC name (6E,10E)-3,7,11,15-tetramethylhexadeca-1,6,10,14-tetraen-3-ol
- Other names: Geranyllinalool; Geranyl linalool; (E,E)-geranyllinalool; 3,7,11,15-Tetramethyl-1,6,10,14-hexadecatetraen-3-ol

Identifiers
CAS Number	1113-21-9
3D model (JSmol)	Interactive image
Beilstein Reference	6713421
ChEBI	CHEBI:74299
ChemSpider	4517814
ECHA InfoCard	100.012.911
EC Number	214-201-8
KEGG	C20681
PubChem CID	5365872
UNII	VV41XXJ67L
CompTox Dashboard (EPA)	DTXSID70883645
- InChI: InChI=1S/C20H34O/c1-7-20(6,21)16-10-15-19(5)14-9-13-18(4)12-8-11-17(2)3/h7,11,13,15,21H,1,8-10,12,14,16H2,2-6H3/b18-13+,19-15+ Key: IQDXAJNQKSIPGB-HQSZAHFGSA-N
- SMILES: CC(=CCC/C(=C/CC/C(=C/CCC(C)(C=C)O)/C)/C)C

Properties
Chemical formula	C_{20}H_{34}O
Molar mass	290.491 g·mol^{−1}
Appearance	pale yellow liquid
Density	0.9 g/cm^{3}
Boiling point	389.9 °C (733.8 °F; 663.0 K)
Solubility in water	insoluble

Hazards
- GHS labelling
Pictograms	(GHS07: Exclamation mark)
Signal word	Warning
Hazard statements	H315, H319, H335
Precautionary statements	P261, P264, P264+P265, P271, P280, P302+P352, P304+P340, P305+P351+P338, P319, P321, P332+P317, P337+P317, P362+P364, P403+P233, P405, P501
Flash point	124.4 °C
- Except where otherwise noted, data are given for materials in their standard state (at 25 °C [77 °F], 100 kPa). Infobox references

Geranyl-linalool is a naturally occurring organic compound classified as a diterpenoid with the molecular formula C_{20}H_{34}O. This is a compound found in various plants and serves as an important intermediate in the biosynthesis of several biologically active compounds.

== Chemical structure ==
Geranyl-linalool is classified as an acyclic alyphatic diterpenoid polyalkene alcohol. The compound includes four isoprene units arranged in a head-to-tail fashion, characteristic of diterpenes.

== Natural occurrence ==
Geranyllinalool is found in various plant species, including: tobacco (Nicotiana tabacum) where it was first identified, ginkgo (Ginkgo biloba), various orchid species, some fungi and marine organisms. The compound is typically present in trace amounts and is often detected through careful phytochemical analysis.

== Biosynthesis ==
Geranyl-linalool is biosynthesized via the plastidial MEP pathway. The compound is formed from geranylgeranyl diphosphate (GGPP) through the action of specific terpene syntheses. The compound serves as a precursor to various cyclic diterpenes and other biologically active compounds in plants. In tobacco, geranyl-linalool is part of the cembranoid diterpene pathway and can be further metabolized into various oxidation products.

== Physcal properties ==
The compound forms a colorless to pale yellow liquid which is insoluble in water, but soluble in organic solvents.

== Uses ==
Geranyl-linalool is commonly used as a fragrance. Its aroma is mild and described as "floral, rose, balsamic". It also demonstrate insecticidal property to xylophagous insects and pine wood. The compound has also been studied for its influence on pyocyanin and Pseudomonas quinolone signal production by Pseudomonas aeruginosa. Geranyl-linalool can also be used as a precursor in the synthesis of teprenone by reacting with acetylated Meldrum's acid.
