= Mycobacterium tuberculosis complex =

Closely related bacterium species that cause tuberculosis

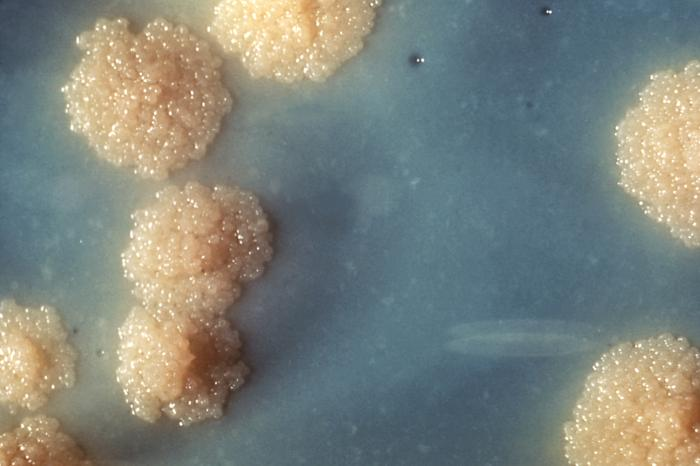
Mycobacterium tuberculosis culture

The Mycobacterium tuberculosis complex (MTC or MTBC) is a genetically related group of Mycobacterium species that can cause tuberculosis in humans or other animals.

It includes:

- Mycobacterium tuberculosis
- Mycobacterium africanum
- Mycobacterium orygis
- Mycobacterium bovis and the Bacillus Calmette–Guérin strain
- Mycobacterium microti
- Mycobacterium canettii
- Mycobacterium caprae
- Mycobacterium pinnipedii
- Mycobacterium suricattae
- Mycobacterium mungi

In addition, two branches exist which have phylogenetic similarities but are not completely described: the dassie and oryx bacilli. Oryx bacilli has been recently reclassified into a separate subspecies, orygis.

Members of the MTC can be distinguished from all other bacteria by the presence of 63 conserved signature indels (CSIs) present in diverse proteins that are exclusively shared by these pathogens. Due to their exclusivity for the MTC complex and presence in highly conserved regions of proteins, these CSIs provide novel means for functional and diagnostic studies (including potential targets for development of novel therapeutics).

Since 2018, all members of this species complex are considered synonyms of M. tuberculosis as far as bacterial nomenclature is concerned. The IJSEM article reports that M. africanum, M. bovis, M. caprae, M. pinnipedii are 99.21–99.92% identical to M. tuberculosis on the whole-genome level, failing the criteria to be considered independent species. The same applies to "M. canetti", "M. mungi", and "M. orygis", species not validly published. The variation is even below the accepted level for subspecies. Authors of the article note that these names do refer to stable lineages with meaningful clinical distinctions, recommending that them become variants: M. bovis would become M. tuberculosis var. bovis, for example.

== Phylogenetics ==
As MTBC diverged into different lineages, so did the expression of key and metabolic pathogenic genes, as a result of mutations introducing new TANNNT Pribnow boxes and mutations that impair the function of transcriptional repressors. This provides clear evidence that MTBC lineages probably reflect adaptation to different human populations. In fact, modifying gene expression could be a rapid mechanism for physiological adaptation to a new environment without the need to substantially change the genome.

This can be seen reflected in the way that the different MTBC clades have their own transcriptomic signature. Even single-point mutations can completely change the transcriptional profile of a strain. An example is the N1177 strain, which carries a single mutation in the rpoB gene that confers resistance to rifampicin that modified transcription levels of multiple genes.

The role of methylation is more elusive, the mutation inactivation pattern seems to confirm that methylases are not preserved throughout mtBC. Transcriptional adaptation can allow M. tuberculosis isolates to optimize their infectivity and transmission in subtly different environments provided by different human host populations.

== See also ==
- Nontuberculous mycobacteria
