= Linda-Gail Bekker =

Zimbabwean physician & academic

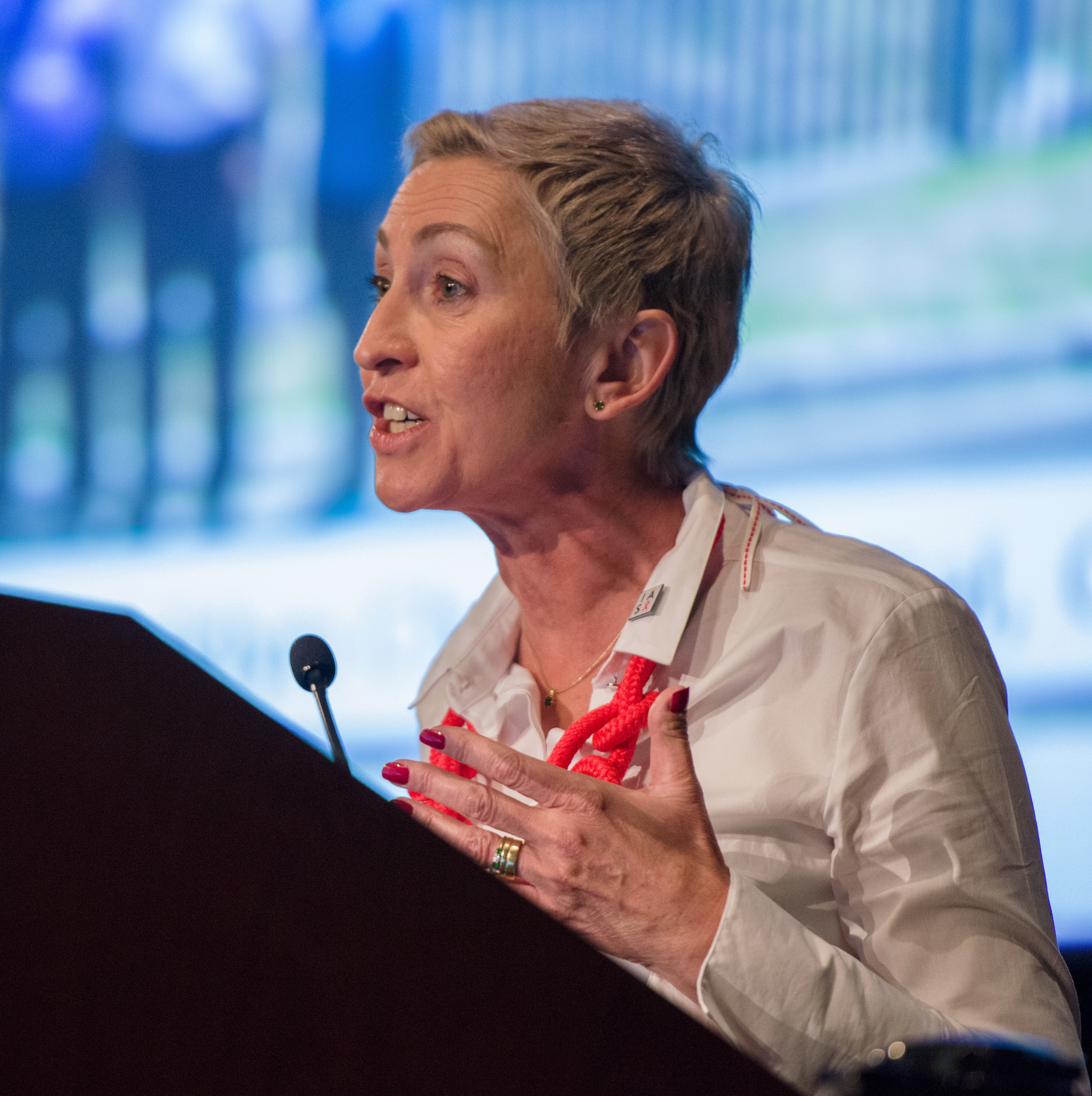
- Bekker speaks at the John E. Fogarty International Center 50th anniversary symposium in 2018
- Education: University of Cape Town; Rockefeller University
- Employers: Desmond Tutu HIV Foundation; University of Cape Town
- Organization: International AIDS Society
- Known for: HIV/AIDS Research

Linda-Gail Bekker MBChB, DTMH, DCH, FCP(SA) is a professor of Medicine and Chief Executive Officer of the Desmond Tutu Health Foundation. She is also Director of the Desmond Tutu HIV Centre at the University of Cape Town. She is a Past President of the International AIDS Society (2016–18).

== Early life and education ==
Bekker was born in Zimbabwe. She studied medicine at the University of Cape Town. She intended on becoming a geriatrician, but completed a clinical rotation in KwaZulu-Natal and became interested in HIV and TB research. She saw young people dying from HIV/AIDS and was frustrated that she couldn't help them. Her PhD was funded by the John E. Fogarty International Center. She worked in the Rockefeller University on host immunology. Her doctoral advisor was Gilla Kaplan and she continues to work with her today.

== Research and career ==
In 2009 she won the Royal Society Pfizer Award for her research into tuberculosis epidemiology. The funding supported her research in the Nyanga Primary Health Clinic in Cape Town. Bekker is passionate about engagement with communities and peer led education programs. Her community work looks to overcome stigma related to HIV and Tuberculosis. The Desmond Tutu HIV Foundation, where Bekker serves as Chief Operating Officer, supports the wellbeing of people in South Africa's poorest communities. Her husband, Robin Wood, serves as the Director and CEO. She developed a mobile health van, known as the Tutu tester, which offers screening for pregnancy, high blood pressure, diabetes, HIV/AIDS, TB and obesity. She is Director of the Desmund Tutu HIV Centre at the University of Cape Town, where she integrates best practise and evidence-based information about adolescent treatment and prevention in a robust platform. The centre is funded by the National Institutes of Health. She developed Choices for Adolescent Methods of Prevention in South Africa (CHAMPS); which challenges young men's attitudes to circumcision, encourages young women to use contraception and investigates Pre-exposure prophylaxis. She has also worked on Pregnancy and HIV/AIDS Seeking Equitable Study (PHASES) funded by the National Institutes of Health. She studies the roll out of antiretroviral therapies. She is excited about HIV self-testing.

In 2016 she was elected President of the International AIDS Society. She gave the opening address at the International AIDS Society Conference in Paris, where she spoke about new prevention options such as Pre-exposure prophylaxis. In 2018 she was elected to the board of the International AIDS Vaccine Initiative. She is concerned about Donald Trump undermining the global HIV response. She has been a keynote speaker at World AIDS Day.

She has contributed to The Conversation. Bekker enjoys painting and has used street theatre in her community work.

Bekker serves as an advisor to the President's Emergency Plan for AIDS Relief.

At the 2024 International AIDS Conference in Munich, Professor Bekker presented results from the PURPOSE-1 study of HIV prevention using twice-yearly injectable lenacapavir that demonstrated twice-yearly injection fully protects women from HIV infection. No participants receiving twice-yearly lenacapavir acquired HIV infection was also reported in The New England Journal of Medicine article.

== COVID-19 ==
Bekker was the co-lead investigator, along with Glenda Gray, of the Sisonke trial that aimed to give the health-care workers in South Africa early access to COVID vaccines. The phase 3b open label clinical trial ran from 17 February 2021 to 15 May 2021, with 478 733 doses given to health care workers. The study tested the efficacy of the Jansen (J&J) vaccine when administered on large scale under South African conditions.
