= Mycobacterium suricattae =

Scientific classification
- Domain: Bacteria
- Kingdom: Bacillati
- Phylum: Actinomycetota
- Class: Actinomycetes
- Order: Mycobacteriales
- Family: Mycobacteriaceae
- Genus: Mycobacterium
- Species: M. suricattae

Binomial name
- Mycobacterium suricattae Parsons et al 2013

Species of tuberculosis bacterium

Mycobacterium suricattae is a species of the tuberculosis complex of the genus Mycobacterium. It causes tuberculosis in meerkats, and was first identified from South African animals in 2013. Prior to this, it was considered to be synonymous with Mycobacterium bovis.

== Transmission and symptoms ==
M. suricattae is transmitted by respiratory particles, bites and allogrooming. In addition to the lungs, the spleen and liver may be infected, and submandibular lymph node swelling is a characteristic symptom. Lymph nodes may swell to the point of rupture, and infected animals almost invariably die within six months without intervention.
