= Desmond Tutu HIV Foundation =

South African nonprofit organization

The Desmond Tutu HIV Foundation (DTHF) is a nonprofit organization founded to provide treatment for and conduct HIV/AIDS research. It is based in Cape Town, South Africa, and is managed with the Desmond Tutu HIV Centre at the University of Cape Town. The Foundation operates community sites throughout greater Cape Town, providing treatment, testing, and outreach services to at-risk communities.

The Desmond Tutu HIV Foundation began as the HIV Research Unit based in New Somerset Hospital in the early 1990s. It was acclaimed as one of the first public clinics to offer anti-retroviral therapy to those living with HIV.

== History ==
The Desmond Tutu HIV Foundation (DTHF) founded by Robin Wood and Linda-Gail Bekker in January 2004. It is supported by Desmond Tutu in its mission to include HIV and tuberculosis treatment, prevention, and training to the most affected populations in the South Africa and beyond. The DTHF has built a reputation for excellence in medical research and innovative community participation and support by working with local and international partners and with City and Provincial health authorities in the Western Cape. The foundation receives funding from PePFAR (President's Emergency Plan for AIDS Relief) DAIDS (Division of Acquired Immunodeficiency Syndrome), the French Development Agency, Bill & Melinda Gates Foundation, and International AIDS Vaccine Initiative, among others.

== Projects ==
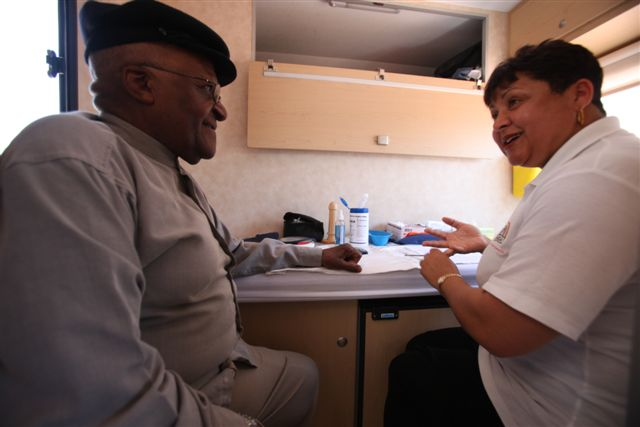
Archbishop Desmond Tutu gets an HIV test on The Desmond Tutu HIV Foundation's Tutu Tester.

The DTHF's projects include support programs for HIV positive youth, distance-learning training manuals and education, clinical support by HIV positive counselors, outreach to vulnerable groups such as men who have sex with men, holistic youth services including a youth center building in Masiphumelele, women's health services, a children's anti-retroviral clinic, and two colorful mobile HIV testing units called Tutu Testers. The DTHF has set up adult and youth community advisory boards to assist in building relationships with communities and increasing their understanding of the studies the DTHF undertakes its sites.

The Desmond Tutu HIV Foundation head office is at the Faculty of Health Sciences, University of Cape Town. Our outreach sites are in Gugulethu, Crossroads, Nyanga, Khayelitsha and Masiphumelele.

The foundation organized South African participantion for the IPrEx study, which was a clinical trial testing the effects of Truvada, a pre-exposure prophylaxis for HIV infection. The IPrEx study recruited participants from six countries—Brazil, Ecuador, Peru, South Africa, Thailand and the United States—partnering with the Desmond Tutu HIV Foundation for recruitment in South Africa.

== Recognition ==
In 2009 Linda-Gail Bekker won the Royal Society Pfizer Award for the research she did at the DTHF concerning HIV and tuberculosis coinfections.

In 2009 South Africa received R3.5 billion in development contracts from France as foreign aid, of which 3.3 million went to the DTHF.
