= Amina Abubakar =

Kenyan academic

- Education: Kenyatta University; Tilburg University
- Awards: Royal Society Pfizer Award 2016
- Scientific career
- Institutions: Kenya Medical Research Institute Lancaster University Utrecht University

KeAmina Abubakar is a Kenyan associate Professor of Psychology and Public Health at Pwani University. She is a research fellow at the Kenya Medical Research Institute. Her research considers the developmental delay in children who have HIV, malnutrition and malaria. She is an honorary fellow at the University of Oxford.

== Early life and education ==
Abubakar earned a Bachelor of Education at Moi University, then studied educational psychology at Kenyatta University. She completed her PhD at Tilburg University in 2008. Her research looked at factors that contributed to risk and resilience of infants in Sub-Saharan Africa. She was a postdoctoral fellow at Utrecht University and the Kenya Medical Research Institute.

== Research and career ==
In 2014 Abubakar joined Lancaster University as a Marie Curie Fellow. She holds a Medical Research Councill Department for International Development African Research Leaders award. She has developed strategies to identify, monitor and rehabilitate at-risk children. She conducted a study of how contextual factors influence well-being in over 7,000 adolescents across 24 countries. She has identified successful interventions to support the psychological development of HIV positive children in East Africa. She found that there was no correlation between the depressive symptoms of mothers and health outcomes of African children.

Abubakar was appointed associate professor at Pwani University in 2016. She is the lead of the neuroscience research group in Kilifi. She was the 2016 winner of the Royal Society Pfizer Award. In 2017 she published the Handbook of Applied Developmental Science in Sub-Saharan Africa. That year she was appointed a Fellow of the African Academy of Sciences.
