= Steven Runo =

Kenyan researcher

- Born: Kenya
- Education: Kenyatta University
- Awards: Royal Society Africa Prize
- Scientific career
- Workplaces: University of California, Davis; Kenyatta University; University of Sheffield; University of Virginia

Steven Runo is a Kenyan researcher who is a professor at Kenyatta University. Runo has extensively studied the pathogens of African cereal crops, including Striga. He was awarded the 2020 Royal Society Africa Prize.

== Early life and education ==
Runo was born in Kenya. He earned his bachelor's, master's and doctoral degrees at Kenyatta University. Runo moved to the United States for his doctoral research, where he joined the University of California, Davis and worked alongside Neelima Sinha. It was here where he started working on long-distance RNA trafficking, focussing initially on communication between Cuscuta and tomatoes.

== Research and career ==
In 2008 Runo returned to Africa, where he was made professor at Kenyatta University. He has been appointed a visiting scientist at the University of Sheffield and University of Virginia. Runo investigates the pathogens which threaten African agriculture. Amongst these, he has studied witchweed (or Striga), a parasitic plant that attacks cultivated cereals. Runo refers to Striga as the "cereal killer".

Whilst Striga-resistant cereal crops can be grown, they typically mutate into versions that are not tolerant to attack. It is estimated that crops lost to Striga cost up to $200 million a year, and each plant can produce up to 500,000 seeds. The seeds are transported by wind and water and can rapidly germinate. Runo has proposed several control strategies; including identifying ways to avoid germination, exploiting host-based resistance and diminishing the Striga seed bank. Amongst these, germination can be avoided through the use of chemical biology; making use of small molecules to bind to the strigolactone receptor. He has also studied how molecular genetics can be used to identify the specific genes that can make crops resistant. To achieve these aims, Runo has investigated the trafficking of RNA molecules between parasitic plants.

Runo is part of the GEMADOT (Genetically Modified for Drought Tolerance) project that looks to identify and develop drought tolerant maize varieties that can prevent food insecurity in Africa.

In 2020 Runo was awarded the Royal Society Africa Prize,

"For elucidating pathways for long distance RNA trafficking between parasitic plants and their hosts and identifying and developing transgenic protocol for characterizing and validating candidate host and parasite genes,"

== Selected publications ==
- Alakonya, Amos; Kumar, Ravi; Koenig, Daniel; Kimura, Seisuke; Townsley, Brad; Runo, Steven; Garces, Helena M.; Kang, Julie; Yanez, Andrea; David-Schwartz, Rakefet; Machuka, Jesse (2012-07-01). "Interspecific RNA Interference of SHOOT MERISTEMLESS-Like Disrupts Cuscuta pentagona Plant Parasitism". The Plant Cell. 24 (7): 3153–3166. Bibcode:2012PlanC..24.3153A. doi:10.1105/tpc.112.099994. ISSN 1040-4651. PMC 3426138. PMID 22822208.
- Runo, Steven; Alakonya, Amos; Machuka, Jesse; Sinha, Neelima (2011). "RNA interference as a resistance mechanism against crop parasites in Africa: a 'Trojan horse' approach". Pest Management Science. 67 (2): 129–136. Bibcode:2011PMSci..67..129R. doi:10.1002/ps.2052. ISSN 1526-4998. PMID 21061276.
- Runo, Steven; Macharia, Sarah; Alakonya, Amos; Machuka, Jesse; Sinha, Neelima; Scholes, Julie (2012-06-21). "Striga parasitizes transgenic hairy roots of Zea mays and provides a tool for studying plant-plant interactions". Plant Methods. 8 (1): 20. Bibcode:2012PlMet...8...20R. doi:10.1186/1746-4811-8-20. ISSN 1746-4811. PMC 3422161. PMID 22720750.
