= Mycobacterium pinnipedii =

Scientific classification
- Domain: Bacteria
- Kingdom: Bacillati
- Phylum: Actinomycetota
- Class: Actinomycetes
- Order: Mycobacteriales
- Family: Mycobacteriaceae
- Genus: Mycobacterium
- Species: M. pinnipedii

Binomial name
- Mycobacterium pinnipedii Cousins et al. 2003, ATCC BAA-688

Species of bacterium

Mycobacterium pinnipedii is a member of the Mycobacterium tuberculosis complex which primarily infects seals. It is a slowly growing pathogenic Mycobacterium. The species was first isolated from the lungs of wild seals in Australia by Debra Cousins and colleagues and was initially called the 'seal bacillus'.

The proposal for identification of the seal bacillus as a new species within the Mycobacterium tuberculosis complex was presented for the first time by Niyaz Ahmed and colleagues based on comprehensive comparative genomic analyses using fluorescent amplified fragment length polymorphisms. Later, the species was taxonomically and validly named by Cousins et al. in 2003 as Mycobacterium pinnipedii after the pinniped species which served as primary hosts of the pathogen.

In 2014, a genetic study showed that a Peruvian human skeleton dating to 1000 CE had been infected with a form of tuberculosis most closely related to M. pinnipedii, suggesting that seals had served as a vector for transmission of tuberculosis from the Old World to the New.
