= Julie Makani =

Tanzanian medical researcher (born 1970)

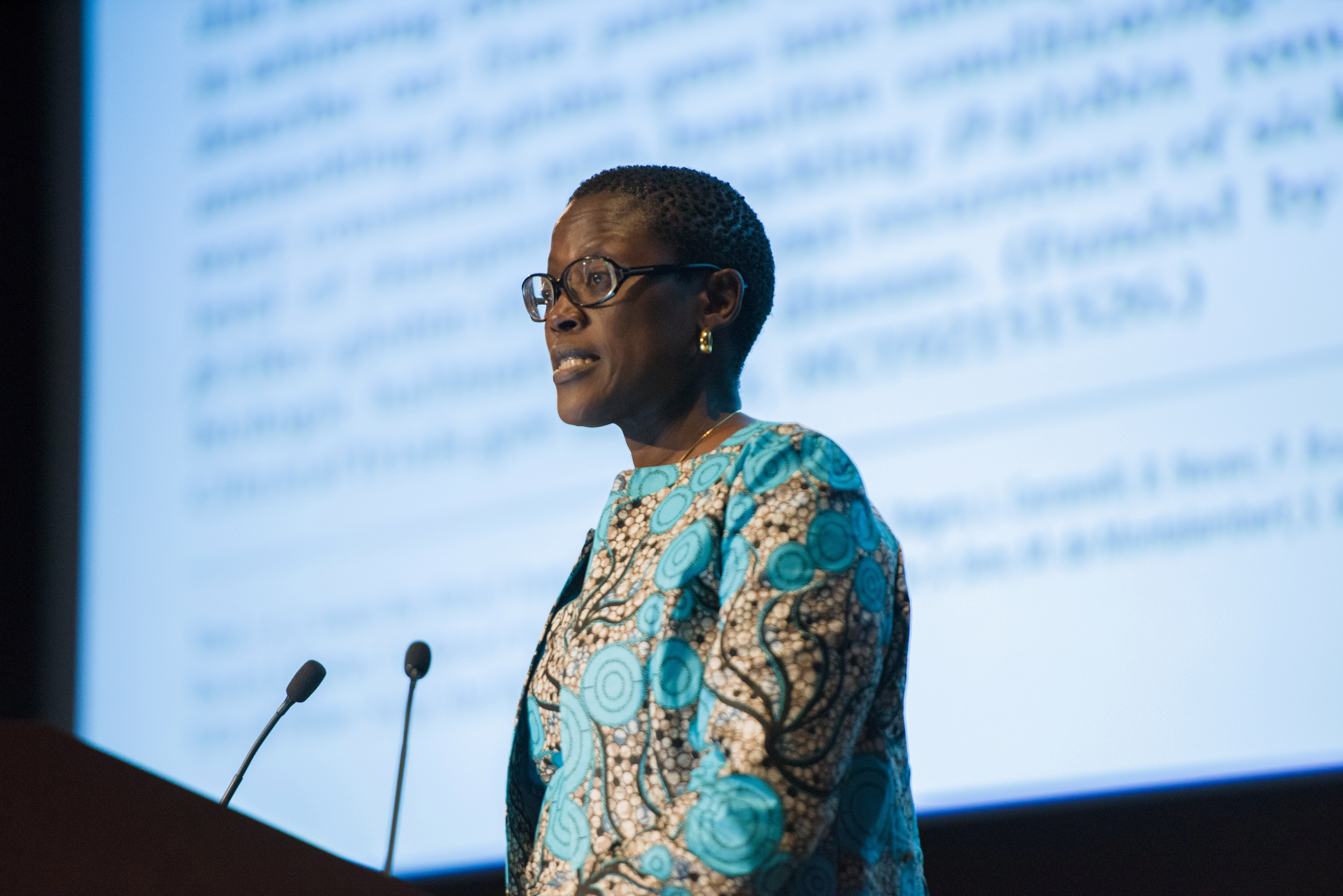
- Makani, May 2018
- Born: 1970 (age 55–56)
- Education: Muhimbili University
- Awards: Royal Society Pfizer Award, 2011
- Scientific career
- Fields: Medical research
- Workplaces: Muhimbili University of Health and Allied Sciences

External videos
- "By the time I started working two of my cousins had already died from sickle cell anemia", Royal Society Pfizer Award 2011

Julie Makani (born 1970) is a Tanzanian medical researcher. Since 2014 she has been a Wellcome Trust research fellow and associate professor in the Department of Haematology and Blood Transfusion at the Muhimbili University of Health and Allied Sciences (MUHAS). She is also a visiting fellow and consultant to the Nuffield Department of Medicine, University of Oxford. She is based in Dar es Salaam, Tanzania. In 2011, she received the Royal Society Pfizer Award for her work with sickle cell disease.

== Education ==
After attending St Constantine's Primary school in Arusha, Tanzania, Makani trained in medicine at Muhimbili University in Tanzania, receiving her medical degree in 1994. In 1997, she attended postgraduate studies in internal medicine at Hammersmith Hospital, Royal Postgraduate Medical School, University of London, on a Commonwealth scholarship. From there she went to Oxford as a Research Fellow at Nuffield Department of Medicine, University of Oxford. She received a four-year PhD training fellowship from the Wellcome Trust in 2003 to study sickle cell disease in Tanzania. She completed her PhD on the clinical epidemiology of sickle cell disease (SCD).

== Biomedical research ==
In 2004, Makani received a Wellcome Trust training fellowship and established the Sickle Cell Disease (SCD) programme at Muhimbili University of Health and Allied Sciences (MUHAS), with prospective surveillance of over 2,000 SCD patients. In sickle cell disease, red blood cells are abnormally shaped, causing problems with the flow of blood through the body and the resulting transport of oxygen throughout the body. A genetic disorder, the disease causes reoccurring episodes of pain and severe organ damage which can result in death. An estimated eight to eleven thousand children per year are born with sickle-cell disease in Tanzania. The focus of Makani's initial work at Muhimbili was to examine factors such as malaria, bacterial infections and stroke, which are considered to significantly contribute to illness and death when interventions are available.

In collaboration with colleagues, she has developed a biomedical research and healthcare programme which is one of the largest SCD cohorts from one centre in the world. Her current interest is in the role of anaemia and foetal haemoglobin in influencing disease burden in SCD.

Makani is working with colleagues to establish networks at a national level in the regional Sickle Cell Disease Research Network of East and Central Africa (REDAC) and Africa (Sickle CHARTA – Consortium for Health, Advocacy, Research and Training in Africa). Makani is co-founder of the Sickle Cell Foundation of Tanzania. On a global level she is on the technical advisory group of Global SCD Research Network, co-chairing the working group responsible for hydroxyurea therapy in Africa.

Her aim is to use sickle cell disease as a model to establish scientific and healthcare solutions in Africa that are locally relevant as well as having global significance. Achieving success in sickle cell disease will illustrate that with effective global partnerships, inequities in biomedical science and health can be addressed.

== Fellowships and other awards ==
Makani received a training (2003) and intermediate fellowship (2011) from the Wellcome Trust for the sickle cell disease programme. In 2007, she received a fellowship to attend the TEDGlobal meeting in Arusha, Tanzania. In 2009, she received an Archbishop Tutu Leadership Fellowship from the African Leadership Institute.

In 2011, she was given the Royal Society Pfizer Award. The award grant will be used for research to provide a better understanding of the molecular, genetic and environmental mechanisms of sickle cell disease. In granting the award, Professor Lorna Casselton of the Royal Society, said: "We are extremely pleased to recognise such an impressive individual with the Royal Society Pfizer Award this year... We hope that Dr Makani stands as role-model for other young Africans scientists wishing to make a difference on their continent and worldwide."

In 2019, Makani was included in the list of BBC 100 Women.
