= Mycobacterium microti =

Scientific classification
- Domain: Bacteria
- Kingdom: Bacillati
- Phylum: Actinomycetota
- Class: Actinomycetes
- Order: Mycobacteriales
- Family: Mycobacteriaceae
- Genus: Mycobacterium
- Species: M. microti

Binomial name
- Mycobacterium microti Reed 1957, ATCC 19422

Species of bacterium

Mycobacterium microti is a member of the Mycobacterium tuberculosis complex (MTBC) known as the 'Vole bacillus', first described as a pathogen of field voles in England.

Wild boars play an active role in maintaining Mycobacterium microti in the environment, but it has also been isolated from other mammalian species, including field voles (Microtus agrestis), wood mice (Apodemus sylvaticus), bank voles (Clethrionomys glareolus), and shrews (Sorex araneus). It is also found in livestock and domestic animals, such as llamas, cats, pigs, cows, and dogs.

== Description ==
Gram-positive, nonmotile, acid-fast rods.

Colony characteristics

- Variable colony morphology, buff in colour, either rough or smooth.

Physiology

- Slow growth on glycerol-free egg media at 37 °C often requiring incubation for 28–60 days. May adapt tolerance to glycerol. May fail to grow in liquid media.
- Usually susceptible to the first line anti tuberculosis antibiotics isoniazid, ethambutol, rifampin, streptomycin and pyrazinamide.

Differential characteristics

Commercially available nucleic acid hybridisation assays are widely used to identify members of the M. tuberculosis complex..

Differentiation between individual members of the M tuberculosis complex is possible using a variety of molecular techniques, and individual strains within a species may be further distinguished using a variety of molecular typing methods.

== Pathogenesis ==
Cause of naturally acquired generalized tuberculosis in voles and other mammals, including cats and new world camelids such as llamas. Human infections are rare, but do occur in both immunocompromised and apparently immunocompetent patients.

== Type strain ==
Strain ATCC 19422 = CIP 104256 = NCTC 8710.
