= Mycobacterium caprae =

Scientific classification
- Domain: Bacteria
- Kingdom: Bacillati
- Phylum: Actinomycetota
- Class: Actinomycetia
- Order: Mycobacteriales
- Family: Mycobacteriaceae
- Genus: Mycobacterium
- Species: M. caprae

Binomial name
- Mycobacterium caprae Aranaz et al. 2003, ATCC BAA-824

Species of bacterium

Mycobacterium caprae is a species of bacteria in the genus Mycobacterium and a member of the Mycobacterium tuberculosis complex. The species is named after the caprines, the organisms from which M. caprae was first isolated. Prior to 2003, the species was referred to as Mycobacterium tuberculosis subsp. caprae. It is also synonymous with the name Mycobacterium bovis subsp. caprae.

M. caprae is a causative agent of tuberculosis in humans. The species has also been isolated from tuberculous lesions in cattle, pigs, deer, and wild boars, as well as from camels and bison.
