= Immunology Letters =

- Discipline: Immunology
- Language: English
- Edited by: Vaclav Horejsi

Publication details
- History: 1979-present
- Publisher: Elsevier
- Frequency: Monthly
- Impact factor: 2.436 (2017)

Standard abbreviations
- ISO 4: Immunol. Lett.

Indexing
- CODEN: IMLED6
- ISSN: 0165-2478 (print); 1879-0542 (web)
- LCCN: sn80002771
- OCLC no.: 05434613

Links
- Journal homepage; Online access

Immunology Letters is a peer-reviewed academic journal of immunology. The journal was established in 1979 and is published by Elsevier on behalf of the European Federation of Immunological Societies on a monthly basis. The current editor is Vaclav Horejsi.

== Indexing and abstracting ==
The journal is indexed and abstracted in the following bibliographic databases:

- SIIC Data Bases
- BIOSIS
- Chemical Abstracts
- Current Contents/Life Sciences
- EMBASE
- MEDLINE
- Pascal et Francis
- Reference Update
- Science Citation Index
- Scopus
