= Isotuberculosinol synthase =

Identifiers
- EC no.: 3.1.7.9

Databases
- IntEnz: IntEnz view
- BRENDA: BRENDA entry
- ExPASy: NiceZyme view
- KEGG: KEGG entry
- MetaCyc: metabolic pathway
- PRIAM: profile
- PDB structures: RCSB PDB PDBe PDBsum
Search
- PMC: articles
- PubMed: articles
- NCBI: proteins

Isotuberculosinol synthase (EC 3.1.7.9, Rv3378c) is an enzyme with systematic name tuberculosinyl diphosphate diphosphohydrolase (isotuberculosinol forming). This enzyme catalyses the following chemical reaction

tuberculosinyl diphosphate + H_{2}O $\rightleftharpoons$ (13S)-isotuberculosinol + diphosphate

This enzyme is present in species of Mycobacterium that cause tuberculosis.
