= Genes & Immunity =

- Discipline: Immunogenetics
- Language: English
- Edited by: Abhishek D. Garg

Publication details
- History: 1999–present
- Publisher: Springer Nature
- Frequency: 6/year
- Impact factor: 5.0 (2023)

Standard abbreviations
- ISO 4: Genes Immun.

Indexing
- ISSN: 1466-4879 (print); 1476-5470 (web)
- LCCN: 00243396
- OCLC no.: 750497139

Links
- Journal homepage; Online archive

Genes & Immunity is a peer-reviewed scientific journal covering the intersection between immunology and genetics. It was established in 1999 and is published eight times per year by Springer Nature. The editor-in-chief is Prof. Abhishek D. Garg (KU Leuven). According to the Journal Citation Reports, the journal has a 2023 impact factor of 5.0, ranking it 47th out of 181 journals in the category "Immunology" and 26th out of 191 in the category "Genetics & Heredity".
