= Isotuberculosinol =

- nosyberkol

Names
- IUPAC name (3-Methyl-5-[(1R,2S,8aS)-1,2,5,5-tetramethyl-1,2,3,5,6,7,8,8a-octahydronaphthalen-1-yl]pent-1-en-3-ol
- Other names Nosyberkol, edaxadiene

Identifiers
3D model (JSmol)	Interactive image
ChEBI	CHEBI:59685
ChemSpider	26331708
PubChem CID	46224604
CompTox Dashboard (EPA)	DTXSID401045772
- InChI: Key: TXBORCBWDUAHAC-AIQOQHTRSA-N; InChI=1S/C20H34O/c1-7-19(5,21)13-14-20(6)15(2)10-11-16-17(20)9-8-12-18(16,3)4/h7,11,15,17,21H,1,8-10,12-14H2,2-6H3/t15-,17+,19?,20+/m0/s1 Key: TXBORCBWDUAHAC-AIQOQHTRSA-N
- SMILES: [H][C@@]12CCCC(C)(C)C1=CC[C@H](C)[C@@]2(C)CCC(C)(O)C=C

Properties
Chemical formula	C_{20}H_{34}O
Molar mass	290.491 g·mol^{−1}
- Except where otherwise noted, data are given for materials in their standard state (at 25 °C [77 °F], 100 kPa). Infobox references

Isotuberculosinol, also called nosyberkol or edaxadiene is a diterpene molecule produced by the bacterium Mycobacterium tuberculosis, the causative agent of TB, which aids in its pathogenesis. Isotuberculosinol functions by preventing maturation of the host-cell phagosome in which the bacterium lives. Maturation of the phagosome would enable it to kill the bacterium. Mutations in genes involved in the biosynthetic pathway of nosyberkol result in normal development of the phagosome and reduction of mycobacterial infection. These biosynthetic genes include isotuberculosinol synthase.

Nosyberkol was originally isolated in 2004 from a marine sponge in the ocean near island of Nosy Be after which it was named. The molecule was characterised as a triterpene but the structure was revised following its chemical synthesis in 2010.
