= Mycobacterium canettii =

Scientific classification
- Domain: Bacteria
- Kingdom: Bacillati
- Phylum: Actinomycetota
- Class: Actinomycetes
- Order: Mycobacteriales
- Family: Mycobacteriaceae
- Genus: Mycobacterium
- Species: M. canettii

Binomial name
- Mycobacterium canettii D van Soolingen, et al., 1997

Species of bacterium

Mycobacterium canettii, a novel pathogenic taxon of the Mycobacterium tuberculosis complex (MTBC), was first reported in 1969 by the French microbiologist Georges Canetti, for whom the organism has been named. It formed smooth and shiny colonies, which is highly exceptional for the MTBC. It was described in detail in 1997 on the isolation of a new strain from a 2-year-old Somali patient with lymphadenitis. It did not differ from Mycobacterium tuberculosis in the biochemical tests and in its 16S rRNA sequence. It had shorter generation time than clinical isolates of M. tuberculosis and presented a unique, characteristic phenolic glycolipid and lipo-oligosaccharide. In 1998, Pfyffer described abdominal lymphatic TB in a 56-year-old Swiss man with HIV infection who lived in Kenya. Tuberculosis caused by M. canettii appears to be an emerging disease in the Horn of Africa. A history of a stay to the region should induce the clinician to consider this organism promptly even if the clinical features of TB caused by M. canettii are not specific. The natural reservoir, host range, and mode of transmission of the organism are still unknown.

M. canettii appears to be the ancestor of M. tuberculosis.
