= Tuberculosinol synthase =

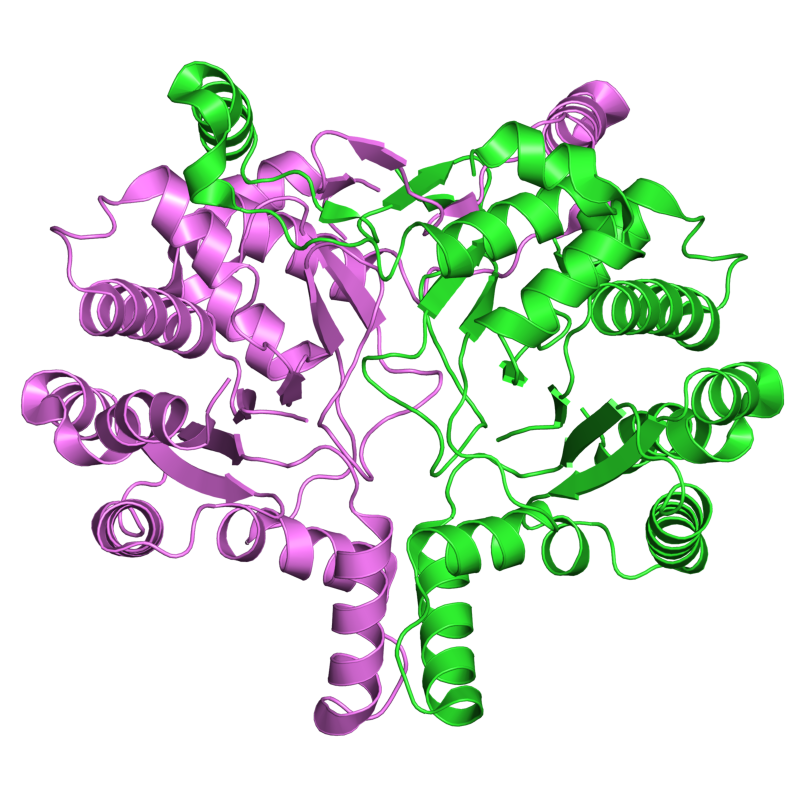
- Crystal structure of tuberculosinol synthase. PDB entry 4cmv

Identifiers
- EC no.: 3.1.7.8

Databases
- IntEnz: IntEnz view
- BRENDA: BRENDA entry
- ExPASy: NiceZyme view
- KEGG: KEGG entry
- MetaCyc: metabolic pathway
- PRIAM: profile
- PDB structures: RCSB PDB PDBe PDBsum
Search
- PMC: articles
- PubMed: articles
- NCBI: proteins

Tuberculosinol synthase (EC 3.1.7.8, Rv3378c) is an enzyme with systematic name tuberculosinyl diphosphate diphosphohydrolase (tuberculosinol forming). This enzyme catalyses the following chemical reaction

tuberculosinyl diphosphate + H_{2}O $\rightleftharpoons$ [tuberculosinol] + diphosphate

This enzyme is present in Mycobacterium that cause tuberculosis.
