= Royal Society Africa Prize =

Scientific excellence award

The Royal Society Africa Prize (formerly known as the Royal Society Pfizer Prize) has been awarded by the Royal Society since 2006 to African-based researchers at the start of their career who are making innovative contributions to the biological sciences in Africa. £60,000 is awarded as a grant for the recipient to carry out a research project that is linked to an African centre of scientific excellence, normally a University or equivalent research centre, and a further £5,000 is given directly to the prizewinner.

The final award under the Pfizer name was made in 2016, after which the award was renamed the Royal Society Africa Prize, and consists of a grant of £11,000 and a gift of £1000.

== Recipients ==
Source: Royal Society

Royal Society Pfizer Prize

- 2006: Alexis Nzila
- 2007: Hiba Mohamed, for her pioneering research into genetic susceptibility to leishmaniasis, a parasitic disease transmitted by sand fly bites
- 2008: Enock Matovu
- 2009: Linda-Gail Bekker, director of the Desmond Tutu HIV Centre, for her outstanding research into tuberculosis and HIV co-infections in Africa
- 2010: Collins Ouma of Maseno University, for his outstanding research into the effect of genetic variation in severe malarial anaemia (SMA) in children.
- 2011: Julie Makani of the Nuffield Department of Clinical Medicine and Muhimbili University, Tanzania, for her outstanding research into using anaemia in sickle cell disease as a model for translating genetic research into health benefits
- 2012: Martin Ota, for his outstanding research into the relationship of pneumococcal protein antibody levels to nasopharyngeal carriage of pneumococci in early infancy.
- 2013: Abdoulaye Diabate, for his important work on the identification of mosquito swarming cues
- 2014: Faith Osier, for her research on understanding the mechanisms of immunity to malaria infection in man
- 2015: Gordon A Awandare, for his achievements in molecular and cellular studies of malaria, including how malaria parasites invade red blood cells and cause disease and Jean-Jacques Muyembe-Tamfum, for his seminal work on viral haemorrhagic fevers, including Ebola, generating the foundation of our understanding of the epidemiology, clinical manifestations and control of outbreaks of these viral infections.
- 2016: Amina Abubakar, for her pioneering psychological research in East Africa and her work developing neurodevelopmental assessments.

Royal Society Africa Prize

- 2017: Allasane Dicko for his contribution to research into malaria control
- 2018: Dorothy Yeboah-Manu or her contributions and innovative approaches to understanding Mycobacterium ulcerans and Mycobacterium africanum
- 2019: Henry Mwandumba for his novel work in description of the TB phagosome in HIV infected alveolar macrophages and his leadership in the College of Medicine in Malawi
- 2020: Steven Runo for elucidating pathways for long distance RNA trafficking between parasitic plants and their hosts and identifying and developing transgenic protocol for characterizing and validating candidate host and parasite genes.
- 2021: George Warimwe for his work on zoonoses vaccine development, capacity building in Africa, and his innovative research proposal
- 2022: Novel Njweipi Chegou for his work in the fields of pulmonary and extrapulmonary tuberculosis, and his innovative project proposal.
- 2023: Kelly Chibale for exceptional leadership and groundbreaking work in drug discovery for African endemic diseases
- 2024: Ali Baklouti for his work on non-commutative harmonic analysis and geometry on homogeneous spaces
- 2025: Ara Monadjem for his unwavering dedication to African biodiversity research and conservation

== See also ==
- List of biology awards
