= Lévy Makani =

Congolese politician

Lévy Makani is a Congolese politician and doctor in sciences. Professor Makani was named Minister of National Education in the government of Ambroise Noumazalaye formed on April 26, 1966. Years later, Makani was First Vice-President of the Union for Democracy and the Republic (UDR-Mwinda), a political party led by André Milongo, from 1992 to 2007.
