= Layla Zakaria Abdel Rahman =

Sudanese scientist and biotechnologist

Dr Layla Zakaria Abdel Rahman
- ليلى زكريا عبدالرحمن
- Died: 2015
- Education: University of Khartoum; University of Manchester Institute of Science and Technology
- Occupation: Biological Technology

Layla Zakaria Abdel Rahman (Arabic: ليلى زكريا عبدالرحمن; died 2015) was a Sudanese scientist in the field of biotechnology.

She graduated from the University of Khartoum and earned her master's and PhD degrees from UMIST. Rahman's work in her research laboratory revolutionized sugar cane cultivation with a cheaper and more effective growing method. By taking cells from the plant's roots, shoots, or leaves, and growing them in a liquid culture, her work enabled the creation of artificial seeds that can be germinated. Her method created global impact in improving efficiency and affordability in developing countries.

She died in 2015, aged 59.
