= Pseudomonas quinolone signal =

Molecule to signal group actions in cells

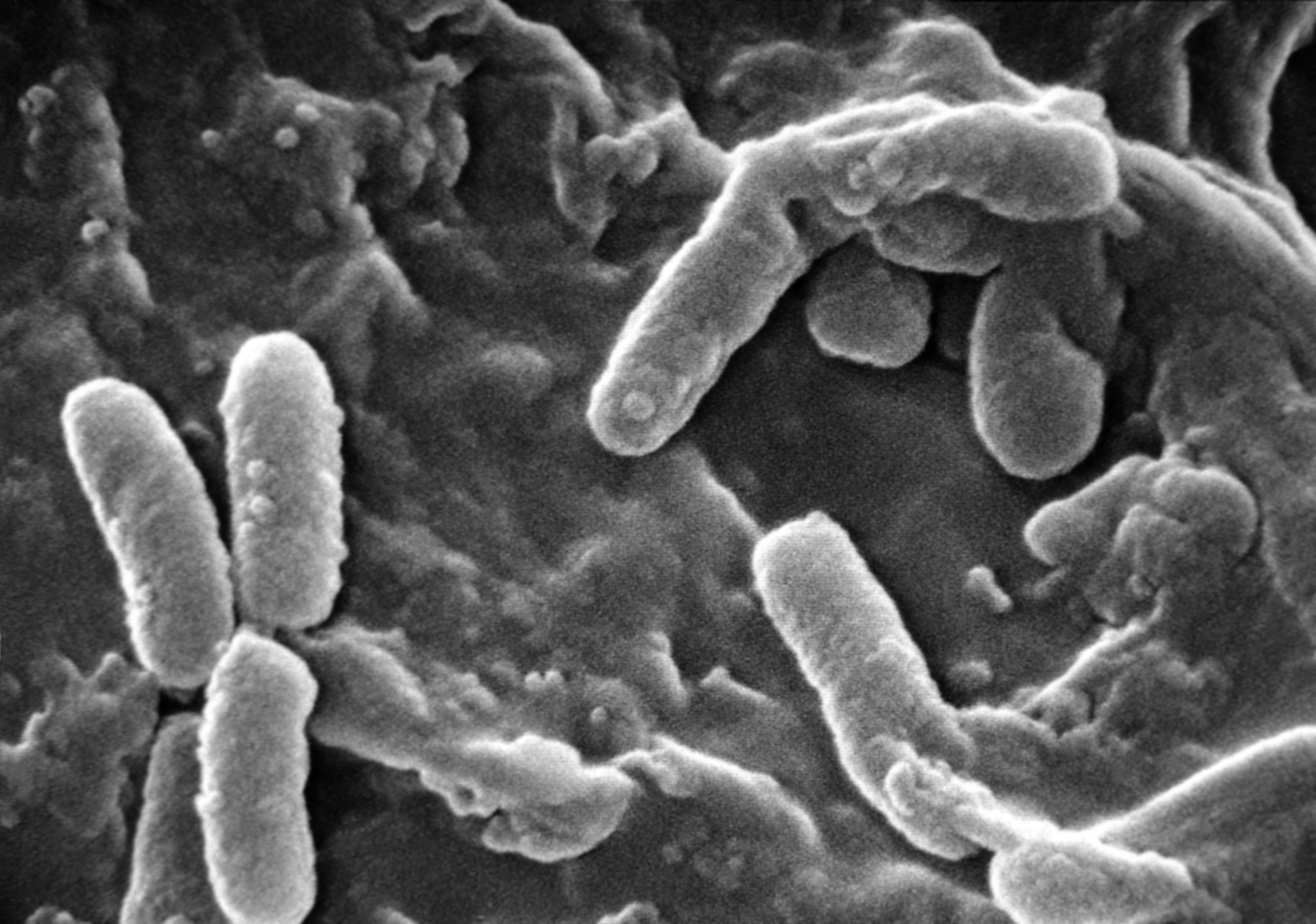
Pseudomonas aeruginosa

The molecule 2-heptyl-3-hydroxy-4-quinolone, also named the Pseudomonas quinolone signal (PQS), has been discovered as an intracellular link between the two major quorum sensing systems of P. aeruginosa; the las and rhl systems. These systems together control expression of virulence factors and play a major role in the formation of biofilms in Pseudomonas aeruginosa. P. aeruginosa is a gram-negative bacteria and opportunistic human pathogen that can cause serious and sometimes fatal infections in humans. Similar to other bacterial species, P. aeruginosa uses quorum sensing (QS) systems to communicate between cells in a population. This allows coordination of gene expression in a population based on changing cell densities, abundance of nutrients, and other environmental factors.

== Function ==
The functional units of quorum sensing are called autoinducers, which are communicatory molecules that can induce conformist actions among a group. Specific autoinducers are used to influence the group in certain ways, upregulating specific functions while suppressing others. In response to a received signal, the target cell will upregulate the production and release of the same autoinducer. This creates a positive feedback cascade in which all proximal cells will express similar metabolic adjustments, morphological characteristics, and motility.

The Pseudomonas Quinolone Signal (PQS) provides a link between the las and rhI quorum sensing systems. The las system regulates the lasB gene that encodes the lasB elastase enzyme. The lasB elastase enzyme is a secreted protease that functions in causing tissue damage to the host. This exo-protease is able to degrade various plasma proteins such as immunoglobulins, coagulation complement factors, and alpha-proteinase inhibitors. The rhI system regulates the rhII gene which encodes for C_{4}-HSL synthase which plays a significant role in biofilm formation.

Only select bacterium can utilize Quorum sensing in their biofilm production; among the predominant users is P. aeruginosa and the genus Burkholderia to form biofilms. Biofilms are important in all aspects of life and are readily abundant in nearly all environments. They are densely populated with several different survivable microenvironments and can often sort based on optimal metabolic location in accordance with metabolites and byproducts. PQS has also been discovered to play a role in mediating denitrification, iron acquisition and cytotoxicity for the cell.
