= Mycobacterium orygis =

Scientific classification
- Domain: Bacteria
- Kingdom: Bacillati
- Phylum: Actinomycetota
- Class: Actinomycetes
- Order: Mycobacteriales
- Family: Mycobacteriaceae
- Genus: Mycobacterium
- Species: M. orygis

Binomial name
- Mycobacterium orygis

Species of bacterium

Mycobacterium orygis is a species of the tuberculosis complex of the genus Mycobacterium. It causes tuberculosis in oryx, rhinos, dairy cattle, rhesus monkeys, and humans.

== Morphology ==
Mycobacterium orygis is similar in morphology to species in the tuberculosis complex of Mycobacterium. It is a non-motile, acid fast bacterium. The cell walls are composed primarily of Mycolic acids. The cells are irregular rods, 0.3–0.5 um in diameter and 2–3 um in length.

== Metabolism ==
Mycobacterium orygis is an obligate aerobe, and a facultative intracellular pathogen. It has a doubling time of 15–20 hours within cells, and longer when outside cells. Mycobacterium orygis uses the host's cells internal fatty acids for both a carbon source and an energy source. These molecules include cholesterol, triacylglycerides, and glycosphingolipids. The optimum growing range for this species is 32 degrees Celsius.

== Genome ==
Strain 51145, obtained from a human diagnosed with tuberculosis meningitis in 1997, has a 4.4 Mbp genome, 4032 genes and a GC content of 65.6%.

== Causative agent of tuberculosis ==
This species is a pathogen of oryx, deer, dairy cattle, rhesus monkeys, and humans. It is internationally spread as of 2021. It is a threat to the greater one-horned rhinoceros, which is considered vulnerable by the ICUN. It can present as respiratory and neurological disease, and forms granulomas which can cause severe health problems and death.
