= Mycobacterium africanum =

Scientific classification
- Domain: Bacteria
- Kingdom: Bacillati
- Phylum: Actinomycetota
- Class: Actinomycetia
- Order: Mycobacteriales
- Family: Mycobacteriaceae
- Genus: Mycobacterium
- Species: M. africanum

Binomial name
- Mycobacterium africanum Castets et al. 1969, ATCC 25420

Species of bacterium

Mycobacterium africanum is a species of Mycobacterium that is most commonly found in West African countries, where it is estimated to cause up to 40% of pulmonary tuberculosis. The symptoms of infection resemble those of M. tuberculosis.

It is a member of the Mycobacterium tuberculosis complex.

== Taxonomy ==
There are seven major lineages in the Mycobacterium tuberculosis complex (MTBC), with lineages 5 and 6 classified as Mycobacterium africanum. MTBC lineage 5 is M. africanum type 1, West African 1 (MAF1), and is classified based on a characteristic deletion of Region of Differentiation (RD) 711. MAF1 is commonly found around the Gulf of Guinea. MTBC lineage 6 is also known as M. africanum type 1, West African 2 (MAF2), and is classified based on a deletion of RD702. MAF2 is prevalent in Western Africa. M. africanum type 2, East African, was previously recognized as a strain of Mycobacterium africanum; it was recently reclassified as Mycobacterium tuberculosis genotype "Uganda" in a sublineage of MTBC lineage 4.

== History ==
M. africanum was first described as a subspecies within the MTBC, with phenotypic characteristics intermediate between M. tuberculosis and M. bovis, based on biochemical testing by Castets in 1968. Early genetic analysis showed that it was distinct from M. tuberculosis due to a genomic RD9 deletion and distinct GyrB nucleotide sequence, and distinct from M. bovis due to an intact RD12 and RD4.

== Microbiology ==
M. africanum is grown in pyruvate-containing media under low oxygen conditions, and forms characteristic "dysgonic" colonies. Unlike M. tuberculosis, M. africanum shows catalase activity, is nitrate negative, and is susceptible to thiopene-2-carboxylic acid hydrazide (TCH) and pyrazinamide (PZA). M. africanum is also slower growing than M. tuberculosis, typically taking 10 weeks to develop colonies rather than 3 to 4 for M. tuberculosis.

== Epidemiology ==
M. africanum is most commonly found in West African countries. It is an infection of humans only and is spread by an airborne route from individuals with open cases of disease.

It is not fully understood why the distribution of M. africanum is limited to West Africa, with only sporadic cases found in other regions. Phylogenetic evidence shows that M. africanum branched at an early stage from modern Mtb lineages in America, Europe and Asia. Some research suggests that M. africanum is adapted to west African populations. M. africanum may be being outcompeted by other Mtb lineages in other regions; however, genetic studies have found no difference in the number of virulence genes or genetic diversity between M. tuberculosis and M. africanum. No animal reservoir has been identified for Mycobacterium africanum despite having been found various wild animals.

It has a similar degree of infectivity to the regular M. tuberculosis organism but is less likely to progress to clinical disease in an immunocompetent individual. However, M. africanum is more likely to progress from infection to causing disease in an HIV positive patient. In countries where M. africanum is endemic, it represents an important opportunistic infection of the later stages of HIV disease.

== Pathogenesis ==
It is not fully understood how the genetic differences between M. africanum and M. tuberculosis give rise to the lower pathogenicity of the former. However, it is known that the Region of Difference 9 (RD9) is lacking in M. africanum but present in M. tuberculosis.

M. africanum also has notable differences in lipid catabolism and metabolism. Additionally, virulence pathways such as the dosR/Rv0081 regulon or ESAT-6 regulation are disrupted in M. africanum.

== Treatment ==
Because of the similar symptoms and different growth conditions between Mycobacterium tuberculosis and africanum, culture methods are unreliable for diagnosis. Molecular biology-based genotyping has improved identification. In particular, "spoligotyping" or "spacer oligonucleotide typing", is a rapid polymerase chain reaction-based method for genotyping strains in the MTBC. Recently, lateral flow rapid tests have been developed based on the mpt64 antigen found in all members of the MTBC.

M. africanum has a lower rate of progression from latency to active disease than M. tuberculosis. M. africanum tuberculosis is treated with an identical regime to tuberculosis caused by M. tuberculosis. The overall rate of cure is similar, but as more M. africanum patients are likely to be HIV positive, they may have higher mortality from other HIV-related disease.

== Type strain ==
ATCC 25420 = CIP 105147

== Bibliography ==
- Skerman, V.B.D.; McGowan, V.; Sneath, P.H.A. (January 1980). "Approved Lists of Bacterial Names". Int. J. Syst. Bacteriol. 30 (1): 225–420. doi:10.1099/00207713-30-1-225.
