= Gordonia sp. nov. Q8 =

Scientific classification
- Domain: Bacteria
- Kingdom: Bacillati
- Phylum: Actinomycetota
- Class: Actinomycetes
- Order: Mycobacteriales
- Family: Gordoniaceae
- Genus: Gordonia
- Species: G.a sp. nov. Q8

Binomial name
- Gordonia sp. nov. Q8

Species of bacterium

Gordonia sp. nov. Q8 is a bacterium in the phylum Actinomycetota. It was discovered in 2017 as one of eighteen new species isolated from the Jiangsu Wei5 oilfield in East China with the potential for bioremediation. Strain Q8 is rod-shaped and gram-positive with dimensions 1.0–4.0 μm × 0.5–1.2 μm and an optimal growth temperature of 40 °C. Phylogenetically, it is most closely related to Gordonia paraffinivorans and Gordonia alkaliphila, both of which are known bioremediators. Q8 was assigned as a novel species based on a <70% ratio of DNA homology with other Gordonia bacteria.

Bioremediation is the process by which polluted soil, water, and other natural materials are treated to encourage growth of microorganisms which can degrade contaminants. It is generally considered more cost-effective and sustainable as compared to other methods of ecosystem restoration. Q8 was chosen for study as a bioremediator due to its ability to grow on media which includes the polycyclic aromatic hydrocarbons (PAHs) naphthalene and pyrene. PAHs are the products of incomplete combustion of fossil fuels and are considered toxic and carcinogenic, in particular to aquatic organisms. Sixteen PAHs are listed as priority pollutants by the U.S. Environmental Protection Agency because of their association with cancer in aquatic animals and increased mutagenicity of sediments.

PAH-degrading microorganisms are commonly found in polluted areas such as oil wells, where they utilize PAHs as their sole carbon and energy source. The study with Q8 demonstrated that the bacterium could degrade nearly all naphthalene and pyrene with 1–2 weeks, indicating that Q8 can grow in the presence of and rapidly degrade PAHs. Q8 can also significantly reduce the viscosity of oil, making it more soluble in water and easier to utilize by other bacteria in a process known as petroleum bioremediation. Other Gordonia have been used to remove boat lubricants from water using a similar mechanism. The process of PAH degradation by Q8 results in products including benzene, hydroxyl and methyl groups, and oxidized oil. Proportions of saturated and aromatic hydrocarbons decrease while resins and asphaltenes increase. Compared to its closest relatives, Q8 is more efficient at removal of PAHs, suggesting future favorability as a bioremediator.
