= Gordonia cholesterolivorans =

Scientific classification
- Domain: Bacteria
- Kingdom: Bacillati
- Phylum: Actinomycetota
- Class: Actinomycetes
- Order: Mycobacteriales
- Family: Gordoniaceae
- Genus: Gordonia
- Species: G. cholesterolivorans

Binomial name
- Gordonia cholesterolivorans Drzyzga et al. 2009

Type strain
- CECT 7408, Chol-3, CIP 110048, DSM 45229, JCM 16227

Species of bacterium

Gordonia cholesterolivorans is a bacterium from the genus Gordonia which has been isolated from sewage sludge from a sewage treatment plant in Ciudad Real in Spain. Gordonia cholesterolivorans has the ability to degrade cholesterol.
