= Gordonia amicalis =

Scientific classification
- Domain: Bacteria
- Kingdom: Bacillati
- Phylum: Actinomycetota
- Class: Actinomycetes
- Order: Mycobacteriales
- Family: Gordoniaceae
- Genus: Gordonia
- Species: G. amicalis

Binomial name
- Gordonia amicalis Kim et al. 2000

Species of bacterium

Gordonia amicalis is a dibenzothiophene-desulphurizing actinomycete with type strain IEGM^{T} (= DSM 44461^{T} = KCTC 9899^{T}).
