= Gordonia hankookensis =

Scientific classification
- Domain: Bacteria
- Kingdom: Bacillati
- Phylum: Actinomycetota
- Class: Actinomycetes
- Order: Mycobacteriales
- Family: Gordoniaceae
- Genus: Gordonia
- Species: G. hankookensis

Binomial name
- Gordonia hankookensis Park et al. 2009

Type strain
- CCUG 57507, JCM 16947, KCTC 19599, ON-33

Species of bacterium

Gordonia hankookensis is a Gram-positive, aerobic and non-motile bacterium from the genus Gordonia.
