= Gordonia soli =

Scientific classification
- Domain: Bacteria
- Kingdom: Bacillati
- Phylum: Actinomycetota
- Class: Actinomycetes
- Order: Mycobacteriales
- Family: Gordoniaceae
- Genus: Gordonia
- Species: G. soli

Binomial name
- Gordonia soli Shen et al. 2006

Type strain
- BCRC 16810, CC-AB07, CCRC 16810, CIP 109465, DSM 44995, IFM 10767, JCM 14298

Species of bacterium

Gordonia soli is a bacterium from the genus of Gordonia which has been isolated from soil in Taiwan.
