= Gordonia hirsuta =

Scientific classification
- Domain: Bacteria
- Kingdom: Bacillati
- Phylum: Actinomycetota
- Class: Actinomycetes
- Order: Mycobacteriales
- Family: Gordoniaceae
- Genus: Gordonia
- Species: G. hirsuta

Binomial name
- Gordonia hirsuta corrig. Klatte et al. 1996

Type strain
- ATCC 700255, CCUG 38498, CECT 7018, CIP 105097, DSM 44140, DSMZ 44140, IFO (now NBRC) 16056, IFO 16056, JCM 10105, K718a, KCTC 9816, NBRC 16056, PCM 2574

Synonyms
- Gordona hirsuta Klatte et al. 1996

Species of bacterium

Gordonia hirsuta is a bacterium from the genus Gordonia which has been isolated from a biofilter of an animal rendering plant in Germany.
