= Gordonia defluvii =

Scientific classification
- Domain: Bacteria
- Kingdom: Bacillati
- Phylum: Actinomycetota
- Class: Actinomycetes
- Order: Mycobacteriales
- Family: Gordoniaceae
- Genus: Gordonia
- Species: G. defluvii

Binomial name
- Gordonia defluvii Soddell et al. 2006

Type strain
- CIP 109401, DSM 44981, J4, NCIMB 14149

Species of bacterium

Gordonia defluvii is a Gram-positive and non-motile bacterium from the genus Gordonia which has been isolated from activated sludge foams in Australia.
