= Gordonia malaquae =

Scientific classification
- Domain: Bacteria
- Kingdom: Bacillati
- Phylum: Actinomycetota
- Class: Actinomycetes
- Order: Mycobacteriales
- Family: Gordoniaceae
- Genus: Gordonia
- Species: G. malaquae

Binomial name
- Gordonia malaquae Yassin et al. 2007

Type strain
- CCUG 53555, CIP 109612, DSM 45064, IFM 10866, IMMIB WWCC-22, JCM 14874

Species of bacterium

Gordonia malaquae is a bacterium from the genus Gordonia which has been isolated from sludge from a wastewater treatment plant in Taiwan.
