= Gordonia lacunae =

Scientific classification
- Domain: Bacteria
- Kingdom: Bacillati
- Phylum: Actinomycetota
- Class: Actinomycetes
- Order: Mycobacteriales
- Family: Gordoniaceae
- Genus: Gordonia
- Species: G. lacunae

Binomial name
- Gordonia lacunae le Roes et al. 2009

Type strain
- BS2, DSM 45085, IFM 10869, JCM 14873, NRRL B-24551

Species of bacterium

Gordonia lacunae is a bacterium from the genus Gordonia which has been isolated from soil from the Plettenberg Bay in South Africa.
