= Gordonia araii =

Scientific classification
- Domain: Bacteria
- Kingdom: Bacillati
- Phylum: Actinomycetota
- Class: Actinomycetes
- Order: Mycobacteriales
- Family: Gordoniaceae
- Genus: Gordonia
- Species: G. araii

Binomial name
- Gordonia araii Kageyama et al. 2006

Type strain
- CCUG 53883, CIP 109346, DSM 44811, IFM 10211, JCM 12131, NBRC 100433

Species of bacterium

Gordonia araii is a Gram-positive and aerobic bacterium from the genus of Gordonia which has been isolated from human sputum in Japan.
