= Gordonia westfalica =

Scientific classification
- Domain: Bacteria
- Kingdom: Bacillati
- Phylum: Actinomycetota
- Class: Actinomycetes
- Order: Mycobacteriales
- Family: Gordoniaceae
- Genus: Gordonia
- Species: G. westfalica

Binomial name
- Gordonia westfalica Linos et al. 2002

Species of bacterium

Gordonia westfalica is a rubber-degrading actinomycete bacterium. It is aerobic and Gram-positive, with type strain Kb2^{T} (=DSM 44215^{T} NRRL B-24152^{T}).
