= Gordonia otitidis =

Scientific classification
- Domain: Bacteria
- Kingdom: Bacillati
- Phylum: Actinomycetota
- Class: Actinomycetes
- Order: Mycobacteriales
- Family: Gordoniaceae
- Genus: Gordonia
- Species: G. G. otitidis

Binomial name
- Gordonia Gordonia otitidis Iida et al. 2005

Type strain
- CCUG 52243, CIP 109016, DSM 44809, IFM 10032, JCM 12355, NBRC 100426

Species of bacterium

Gordonia otitidis is a bacterium from the genus Gordonia which has been isolated from a patient with external otitis in Japan.
