= Gordonia neofelifaecis =

Scientific classification
- Domain: Bacteria
- Kingdom: Bacillati
- Phylum: Actinomycetota
- Class: Actinomycetes
- Order: Mycobacteriales
- Family: Gordoniaceae
- Genus: Gordonia
- Species: G. neofelifaecis

Binomial name
- Gordonia neofelifaecis Liu et al. 2011

Type strain
- AD-6, CCTCC AB-209144, NRRL B-59395

Species of bacterium

Gordonia neofelifaecis is a bacterium from the genus Gordonia which has been isolated from faeces from the leopard (Neofelis nebulosa) in the Sichuan Province in China.
