= Gordonia effusa =

Scientific classification
- Domain: Bacteria
- Kingdom: Bacillati
- Phylum: Actinomycetota
- Class: Actinomycetes
- Order: Mycobacteriales
- Family: Gordoniaceae
- Genus: Gordonia
- Species: G. effusa

Binomial name
- Gordonia effusa Kageyama et al. 2006

Type strain
- CCUG 53882, CIP 109345, DSM 44810, IFM 10200, JCM 12130, NBRC 100432

Species of bacterium

Gordonia effusa is a bacterium from the genus Gordonia which has been isolate from human sputum in Japan.
