= Gordonia sinesedis =

Scientific classification
- Domain: Bacteria
- Kingdom: Bacillati
- Phylum: Actinomycetota
- Class: Actinomycetes
- Order: Mycobacteriales
- Family: Gordoniaceae
- Genus: Gordonia
- Species: G. sinesedis

Binomial name
- Gordonia sinesedis Maldonado et al. 2003

Type strain
- CIP 108187, DSM 44455, J72, JCM 12126, NCIMB 13802

Species of bacterium

Gordonia sinesedis is a bacterium from the genus of Gordonia that has been isolated from soil.
