= Gordonia desulfuricans =

Scientific classification
- Domain: Bacteria
- Kingdom: Bacillati
- Phylum: Actinomycetota
- Class: Actinomycetes
- Order: Mycobacteriales
- Family: Gordoniaceae
- Genus: Gordonia
- Species: G. desulfuricans

Binomial name
- Gordonia desulfuricans Kim et al. 1999

Type strain
- 213E, BCRC 16388, CCRC 16388, CIP 109045, DSM 44462, IFM 10355, JCM 11762, KCTC 9941, NBRC 100010, NCIMB 40816

Species of bacterium

Gordonia desulfuricans is a benzothiophene-desulphurizing bacterium from the genus Gordonia which has been isolated from soil from West Calder in Scotland.
