= Gordonia iterans =

Scientific classification
- Domain: Bacteria
- Kingdom: Bacillati
- Phylum: Actinomycetota
- Class: Actinomycetes
- Order: Mycobacteriales
- Family: Gordoniaceae
- Genus: Gordonia
- Species: G. iterans

Binomial name
- Gordonia iterans Kang et al. 2014

Type strain
- CCTCC M2011245, IFM 10348, NCCB 100436

Species of bacterium

Gordonia iterans is a bacterium from the genus Gordonia which has been isolated from a patient with pneumonia.
