= Gordonia shandongensis =

Scientific classification
- Domain: Bacteria
- Kingdom: Bacillati
- Phylum: Actinomycetota
- Class: Actinomycetes
- Order: Mycobacteriales
- Family: Gordoniaceae
- Genus: Gordonia
- Species: G. shandongensis

Binomial name
- Gordonia shandongensis Luo et al. 2007

Type strain
- CGMCC 4.3492, DSM 45094, SD29, JCM 13907

Species of bacterium

Gordonia shandongensis is a bacterium from the genus Gordonia which has been isolated from farmland soil in China.
