= Gordonia humi =

Scientific classification
- Domain: Bacteria
- Kingdom: Bacillati
- Phylum: Actinomycetota
- Class: Actinomycetes
- Order: Mycobacteriales
- Family: Gordoniaceae
- Genus: Gordonia
- Species: G. humi

Binomial name
- Gordonia humi Kämpfer et al. 2011

Type strain
- CC-12301, CCM 7727, CIP 110237, DSM 45298, JCM 17969

Species of bacterium

Gordonia humi is a Gram-positive and non-spore-forming bacterium from the genus Gordonia which has been isolated from soil near the mushroom Agaricus brasiliensis in Taiwan.
