= Gordonia phosphorivorans =

Scientific classification
- Domain: Bacteria
- Kingdom: Bacillati
- Phylum: Actinomycetota
- Class: Actinomycetes
- Order: Mycobacteriales
- Family: Gordoniaceae
- Genus: Gordonia
- Species: G. phosphorivorans

Binomial name
- Gordonia phosphorivorans Kämpfer et al. 2013

Type strain
- Ca8, CCM 7957, CCUG 61533, DSM 45630, LMG 26648

Species of bacterium

Gordonia phosphorivorans is a Gram-positive and non-spore-forming bacterium from the genus Gordonia which has been isolated from a wastewater treatment bioreactor in Aachen in Germany.
