= Gordonia sihwensis =

Scientific classification
- Domain: Bacteria
- Kingdom: Bacillati
- Phylum: Actinomycetota
- Class: Actinomycetes
- Order: Mycobacteriales
- Family: Gordoniaceae
- Genus: Gordonia
- Species: G. sihwensis

Binomial name
- Gordonia sihwensis Kim et al. 2003

Type strain
- BCRC 16380, CCRC 16380, CIP 108158, DSM 44576, IFM 10619, JCM 13435, KAIST, NRRL B-24155, SPR2

Species of bacterium

Gordonia sihwensis is a Gram-positive and nitrate-reducing bacterium from the genus of Gordonia which has been isolated from an autotrophic denitrification reactor in Sihwa in Korea.
