= Gordonia caeni =

Scientific classification
- Domain: Bacteria
- Kingdom: Bacillati
- Phylum: Actinomycetota
- Class: Actinomycetes
- Order: Mycobacteriales
- Family: Gordoniaceae
- Genus: Gordonia
- Species: G. caeni

Binomial name
- Gordonia caeni Srinivasan et al. 2012

Type strain
- JCM 16923, KCTC 19771, MJ32

Species of bacterium

Gordonia caeni is a Gram-positive, strictly aerobic, short-rod-shaped and non-motile bacterium from the genus Gordonia which has been isolated from sludge from a sewage disposal plant in Daejeon in Korea.
