= Tsukamurella soli =

Scientific classification
- Domain: Bacteria
- Kingdom: Bacillati
- Phylum: Actinomycetota
- Class: Actinomycetes
- Order: Mycobacteriales
- Family: Tsukamurellaceae
- Genus: Tsukamurella
- Species: T. soli

Binomial name
- Tsukamurella soli Weon et al. 2010

Type strain
- CIP 110195, DSM 45046, JCM 17688, JS18-1, KACC 20764

Species of bacterium

Tsukamurella soli is a Gram-positive and rod-shaped bacterium from the genus of Tsukamurella which has been isolated from forest soil from the Hallasan mountain on Jeju Island in Korea.
