= Gordonia rhizosphera =

Scientific classification
- Domain: Bacteria
- Kingdom: Bacillati
- Phylum: Actinomycetota
- Class: Actinomycetes
- Order: Mycobacteriales
- Family: Gordoniaceae
- Genus: Gordonia
- Species: G. rhizosphera

Binomial name
- Gordonia rhizosphera corrig. Takeuchi and Hatano 1998

Type strain
- 141, BCRC 16393, CCRC 16393, CIP 105727, DSM 44383, IFM 10357, IFO 16068, JCM 10426, KCTC 9824, NBRC 16068, NCIMB 13848, VKM Ac-2072

Synonyms
- Gordona rhizosphera Takeuchi and Hatano 1998

Species of bacterium

Gordonia rhizosphera is a bacterium from the genus Gordonia which has been isolated from rhizosphere soil from a mangrove plant in Japan.
