= Quadrisphaera granulorum =

Scientific classification
- Domain: Bacteria
- Kingdom: Bacillati
- Phylum: Actinomycetota
- Class: Actinomycetia
- Order: Kineosporiales
- Family: Kineosporiaceae
- Genus: Quadrisphaera
- Species: Q. granulorum

Binomial name
- Quadrisphaera granulorum Maszenan et al. 2005

Type strain
- AG019; ATCC BAA-1104; DSM 44889; JCM 16010

Species of bacteria

Quadrisphaera granulorum is a Gram-positive species of bacteria that has been isolated from sludge biomass from Singapore.
