= Cryptosporangium eucalypti =

Scientific classification
- Domain: Bacteria
- Kingdom: Bacillati
- Phylum: Actinomycetota
- Class: Actinomycetes
- Order: Cryptosporangiales
- Family: Cryptosporangiaceae
- Genus: Cryptosporangium
- Species: C. eucalypti

Binomial name
- Cryptosporangium eucalypti Himaman et al. 2017

Type strain
- BCC 77605; EURKPP3H10; NBRC 111482

Species of bacterium

Cryptosporangium eucalypti is a bacterium species from the genus of Cryptosporangium which has been isolated from the roots of the tree Eucalyptus camaldulensis from Kamphaeng Phet Province in Thailand.
