= Dietzia aurantiaca =

Scientific classification
- Domain: Bacteria
- Kingdom: Bacillati
- Phylum: Actinomycetota
- Class: Actinomycetes
- Order: Mycobacteriales
- Family: Dietziaceae
- Genus: Dietzia
- Species: D. aurantiaca

Binomial name
- Dietzia aurantiaca Kämpfer et al. 2012

Type strain
- CCUG 35676, CCUG 35676, JCM 17645

Species of bacterium

Dietzia aurantiaca is a Gram-positive, aerobic, coccoid and non-spore-forming bacterium from the genus Dietzia which has been isolated from the cerebrospinal fluid from a patient from Gothenburg in Sweden.
