= Tsukamurella hominis =

Scientific classification
- Domain: Bacteria
- Kingdom: Bacillati
- Phylum: Actinomycetota
- Class: Actinomycetes
- Order: Mycobacteriales
- Family: Tsukamurellaceae
- Genus: Tsukamurella
- Species: T. hominis

Binomial name
- Tsukamurella hominis Teng et al. 2018

Type strain
- DSM 105036, JCM 31971, HKU65

Species of bacterium

Tsukamurella hominis is a Gram-positive, non-spore-forming and non-motile bacterium from the genus of Tsukamurella which has been isolated from a conjunctival swab.
