= Catenulispora graminis =

Scientific classification
- Domain: Bacteria
- Kingdom: Bacillati
- Phylum: Actinomycetota
- Class: Actinomycetes
- Order: Catenulisporales
- Family: Catenulisporaceae
- Genus: Catenulispora
- Species: C. graminis

Binomial name
- Catenulispora graminis Lee et al. 2012

Type strain
- BR-34

Species of bacterium

Catenulispora graminis is a bacterium from the genus of Catenulispora which has been isolated from rizopheric soil from the bamboo Phyllostachys nigro var. henonis from Damyang in Korea.
