= Catenulispora fulva =

Scientific classification
- Domain: Bacteria
- Kingdom: Bacillati
- Phylum: Actinomycetota
- Class: Actinomycetes
- Order: Catenulisporales
- Family: Catenulisporaceae
- Genus: Catenulispora
- Species: C. fulva

Binomial name
- Catenulispora fulva Lee and Whang 2016

Type strain
- SA-246

Species of bacterium

Catenulispora fulva is a bacterium from the genus of Catenulispora which has been isolated from forest soil from Chungnam in Korea.
