= Dietzia psychralcaliphila =

Scientific classification
- Domain: Bacteria
- Kingdom: Bacillati
- Phylum: Actinomycetota
- Class: Actinomycetes
- Order: Mycobacteriales
- Family: Dietziaceae
- Genus: Dietzia
- Species: D. psychralcaliphila

Binomial name
- Dietzia psychralcaliphila Yumoto et al. 2002

Species of bacterium

Dietzia psychralcaliphila is a facultatively psychrophilic alkaliphile that grows on hydrocarbons. It is aerobic, non-motile and gram-positive. The type strain is ILA-1^{T} (= JCM 10987^{T} = IAM14896^{T} = NCIMB 13777^{T}).
