= Tsukamurella inchonensis =

Scientific classification
- Domain: Bacteria
- Kingdom: Bacillati
- Phylum: Actinomycetota
- Class: Actinomycetes
- Order: Mycobacteriales
- Family: Tsukamurellaceae
- Genus: Tsukamurella
- Species: T. inchonensis

Binomial name
- Tsukamurella inchonensis Yassin et al. 1995

Species of bacterium

Tsukamurella inchonensis is a bacterium with type strain IMMIB D-771^{T} (= DSM 44067^{T}).
