= Dietzia papillomatosis =

Scientific classification
- Domain: Bacteria
- Kingdom: Bacillati
- Phylum: Actinomycetota
- Class: Actinomycetes
- Order: Mycobacteriales
- Family: Dietziaceae
- Genus: Dietzia
- Species: D. papillomatosis

Binomial name
- Dietzia papillomatosis Jones et al. 2008

Type strain
- DSM 44961, IFM 10921, JCM 15317, N 1280, NCIMB 14145

Species of bacterium

Dietzia papillomatosis is a bacterium from the genus Dietzia which has been isolated from the skin scrapings of a patient in the United Kingdom.
