= Pseudokineococcus lusitanus =

Scientific classification
- Domain: Bacteria
- Kingdom: Bacillati
- Phylum: Actinomycetota
- Class: Actinomycetes
- Order: Kineosporiales
- Family: Kineosporiaceae
- Genus: Pseudokineococcus
- Species: P. lusitanus

Binomial name
- Pseudokineococcus lusitanus Jurado et al. 2011

Type strain
- CECT 7306; DSM 23768; CECT 7306; LMG 24148

Species of bacterium

Pseudokineococcus lusitanus is a Gram-positive, coccus-shaped and motile bacterium from the genus of Pseudokineococcus which has been isolated from a roof tile from Porto in Portugal.
