= Dietzia aerolata =

Scientific classification
- Domain: Bacteria
- Kingdom: Bacillati
- Phylum: Actinomycetota
- Class: Actinomycetes
- Order: Mycobacteriales
- Family: Dietziaceae
- Genus: Dietzia
- Species: D. aerolata

Binomial name
- Dietzia aerolata Kämpfer et al. 2010

Type strain
- CCM 7659, DSM 45334, JCM 17966, Sj14a

Species of bacterium

Dietzia aerolata is a Gram-positive, coccoid and non-spore-forming bacterium from the genus Dietzia which has been isolated from air from a duck barn in Berlin in Germany.
