= Angustibacter aerolatus =

Scientific classification
- Domain: Bacteria
- Kingdom: Bacillati
- Phylum: Actinomycetota
- Class: Actinomycetes
- Order: Kineosporiales
- Family: Kineosporiaceae
- Genus: Angustibacter
- Species: A. aerolatus

Binomial name
- Angustibacter aerolatus Kim et al. 2013

Type strain
- 7402J-48; KACC 15527; NBRC 108730

Species of bacterium

Angustibacter aerolatus is a Gram-positive and aerobic bacterium from the genus of Angustibacter which has been isolated from air from Jeju Island in Korea.
