= Tsukamurella serpentis =

Scientific classification
- Domain: Bacteria
- Kingdom: Bacillati
- Phylum: Actinomycetota
- Class: Actinomycetes
- Order: Mycobacteriales
- Family: Tsukamurellaceae
- Genus: Tsukamurella
- Species: T. serpentis

Binomial name
- Tsukamurella serpentis Tang et al. 2016

Type strain
- DSM 100915, JCM 31017, HKU54, HKU55

Species of bacterium

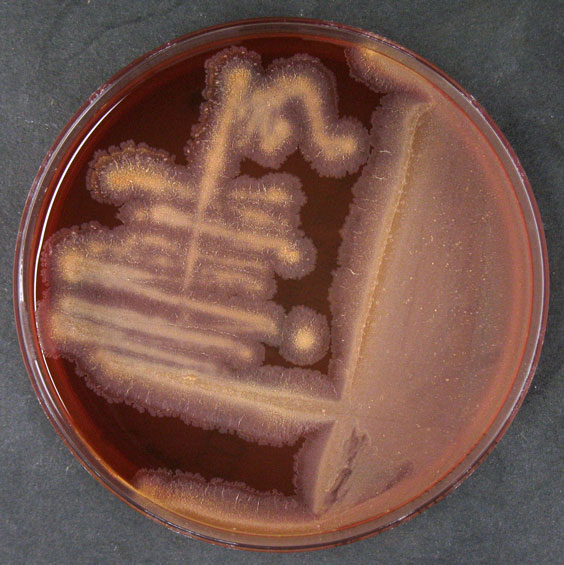
Tsukamurella serpentis in a petri dish

Tsukamurella serpentis is a bacterium from the genus of Tsukamurella which has been isolated from the mouth of the snake Naja atra from the Queen Mary Hospital in Hong Kong.
