= Motilibacter rhizosphaerae =

Scientific classification
- Domain: Bacteria
- Kingdom: Bacillati
- Phylum: Actinomycetota
- Class: Actinomycetia
- Order: Frankiales
- Family: Motilibacteraceae
- Genus: Motilibacter
- Species: M. rhizosphaerae

Binomial name
- Motilibacter rhizosphaerae Lee 2013

Type strain
- DSM 45622; KACC 16209; RS-16

Species of bacterium

Motilibacter rhizosphaerae is a bacterium from the genus of Motilibacter which has been isolated from rhizospheric soil from the plant Peucedanum japonicum from the Mara Island in Korea.
