= Cryptosporangium aurantiacum =

Scientific classification
- Domain: Bacteria
- Kingdom: Bacillati
- Phylum: Actinomycetota
- Class: Actinomycetes
- Order: Cryptosporangiales
- Family: Cryptosporangiaceae
- Genus: Cryptosporangium
- Species: C. aurantiacum

Binomial name
- Cryptosporangium aurantiacum Tamura and Hatano 2001

Type strain
- 71-C38; CGMCC 4.1052; DSM 46144; IFO 13967; IMET 9261; JCM 3241; KCC A-0241; KCTC 9529; NBRC 13967; NCIMB 12649; NRRL B-16698

Species of bacterium

Cryptosporangium aurantiacum is a bacterium.
