= Motilibacter peucedani =

Scientific classification
- Domain: Bacteria
- Kingdom: Bacillati
- Phylum: Actinomycetota
- Class: Actinomycetia
- Order: Frankiales
- Family: Motilibacteraceae
- Genus: Motilibacter
- Species: M. peucedani

Binomial name
- Motilibacter peucedani Lee 2012

Type strain
- DSM 45328; KCTC 19630; RP-AC37

Species of bacterium

Motilibacter peucedani is a Gram-positive, aerobic and motile bacterium from the genus of Motilibacter which has been isolated from rhizosphere soil of the plant Peucedanum japonicum from Mara Island in Korea.
