= Jongsikchunia kroppenstedtii =

Scientific classification
- Domain: Bacteria
- Kingdom: Bacillati
- Phylum: Actinomycetota
- Class: Actinomycetes
- Order: Mycobacteriales
- Family: Gordoniaceae
- Genus: Jongsikchunia; Nouioui et al. 2018
- Species: J. kroppenstedtii

Binomial name
- Jongsikchunia kroppenstedtii (Kim et al. 2009) Nouioui et al. 2018

Type strain
- CIP 110031; DSM 45133; JCM 16948; KCTC 19360; NP8-5

Synonyms
- Gordonia kroppenstedtii Kim et al. 2009

Species of bacterium

Jongsikchunia kroppenstedtii is a bacterium from the genus Jongsikchunia which has been isolated from polluted stream in Gumi, South Korea. Jongsikchunia kroppenstedtii has the ability to degrade phenol.
