= Dietzia maris =

Scientific classification
- Domain: Bacteria
- Kingdom: Bacillati
- Phylum: Actinomycetota
- Class: Actinomycetes
- Order: Mycobacteriales
- Family: Dietziaceae
- Genus: Dietzia
- Species: D. maris

Binomial name
- Dietzia maris (Nesterenko et al. 1982) Rainey et al. 1995

Type strain
- ATCC 35013; AUCNM A-593; DSM 43672; IMET 7760; IMV 195

Synonyms
- Dietzia cinnamea Yassin et al. 2006; "Flavobacterium maris" Harrison 1929; Rhodococcus maris (ex Harrison 1929) Nesterenko et al. 1982

Species of bacterium

Dietzia maris is a Gram-positive and aerobic bacterium from the genus Dietzia. Dietzia species are characterized as Gram-positive, catalase-positive cells that appear as cocci or short rods and produce a noticeable orange pigment from carotenoids.¹ Dietzia species have extracellular enzyme production such as casein-degrading proteases and starch-breaking amylases.² Dietzia grows well within a moderate temperature range (25–37 °C) and does not grow at low or high extreme temperatures.³ Dietzia species were originally isolated from environmental substrates, such as soil and plant-associated material.³ Multiple species of Dietzia have been reported to produce biosurfactants that can solubilize hydrocarbons.⁴
