= Angustibacter peucedani =

Scientific classification
- Domain: Bacteria
- Kingdom: Bacillati
- Phylum: Actinomycetota
- Class: Actinomycetes
- Order: Kineosporiales
- Family: Kineosporiaceae
- Genus: Angustibacter
- Species: A. peucedani

Binomial name
- Angustibacter peucedani Lee 2013

Type strain
- DSM 45329; KCTC 19628; RS-50

Species of bacterium

Angustibacter peucedani is a Gram-positive and strictly aerobic bacterium from the genus of Angustibacter which has been isolated from rhizospheric soil from the plant Peucedanum japonicum from Mara Island in Korea.
