= Tsukamurella tyrosinosolvens =

Scientific classification
- Domain: Bacteria
- Kingdom: Bacillati
- Phylum: Actinomycetota
- Class: Actinomycetes
- Order: Mycobacteriales
- Family: Tsukamurellaceae
- Genus: Tsukamurella
- Species: T. tyrosinosolvens

Binomial name
- Tsukamurella tyrosinosolvens Yassin et al. 1997

Type strain
- CCUG 38499, CIP 106771, DSM 44234, IFM 810, IMMIB D-1397, JCM 10112, KCTC 19177, KCTC 9965, PCM 2579

Synonyms
- Tsukamurella carboxydivorans Park et al. 2009

Species of bacterium

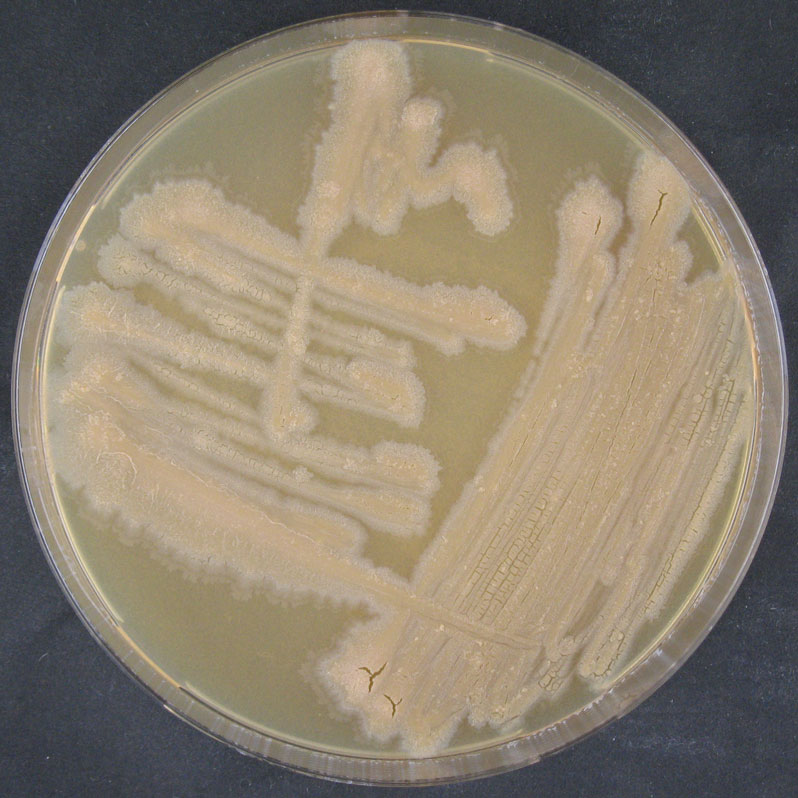
Tsukamurella tyrosinosolvens

Tsukamurella tyrosinosolvens is a Gram-positive and aerobic bacterium from the genus Tsukamurella. Tsukamurella tyrosinosolvens bacteria can cause in rare cases infections in humans.
