= Gordonia namibiensis =

Scientific classification
- Domain: Bacteria
- Kingdom: Bacillati
- Phylum: Actinomycetota
- Class: Actinomycetes
- Order: Mycobacteriales
- Family: Gordoniaceae
- Genus: Gordonia
- Species: G. G. namibiensis

Binomial name
- Gordonia Gordonia namibiensis Brandão et al. 2002

Type strain
- BCRC 16392, CCRC 16392, CCUG 47264, CCUG 47264 A, CCUG 47264 B, CIP 107614, DSM 44568, IFM 10356, JCM 12074, KCTC 9952, N1293, NAM-BN063A, NCIMB 13800

Species of bacterium

Gordonia namibiensis is a bacterium from the genus Gordonia which has been isolated from soil from Kalahari in Namibia. Gordonia namibiensis metabolises nitrile.
