= Tsukamurella spumae =

Scientific classification
- Domain: Bacteria
- Kingdom: Bacillati
- Phylum: Actinomycetota
- Class: Actinomycetes
- Order: Mycobacteriales
- Family: Tsukamurellaceae
- Genus: Tsukamurella
- Species: T. spumae

Binomial name
- Tsukamurella spumae Nam et al. 2003

Type strain
- CCUG 48751, CIP 108213, DSM 44113, IFM 10523, JCM 12608, N1171, NCIMB 13947

Species of bacterium

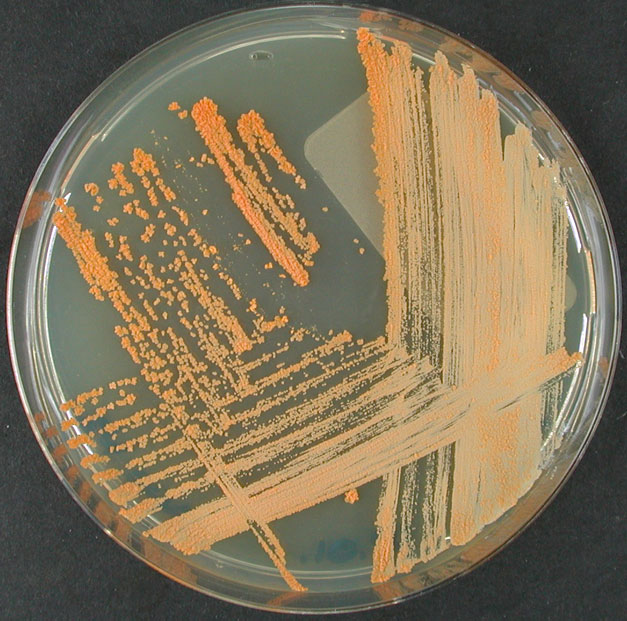
Tskamurella Spumae

Tsukamurella spumae is a bacterium from the genus of Tsukamurella which has been isolated from foam from an activated sludge plant in England.
