= Dietzia cercidiphylli =

Scientific classification
- Domain: Bacteria
- Kingdom: Bacillati
- Phylum: Actinomycetota
- Class: Actinomycetes
- Order: Mycobacteriales
- Family: Dietziaceae
- Genus: Dietzia
- Species: D. cercidiphylli

Binomial name
- Dietzia cercidiphylli Li et al. 2008

Type strain
- CCTCC AA 207016, DSM 45140, JCM 16002, YIM 65002

Species of bacterium

Dietzia cercidiphylli is a bacterium from the genus Dietzia which has been isolated from roots of the tree Cercidiphyllum japonicum in China.
