= Gordonia (bacterium) =

Scientific classification
- Domain: Bacteria
- Kingdom: Bacillati
- Phylum: Actinomycetota
- Class: Actinomycetes
- Order: Mycobacteriales
- Family: Gordoniaceae
- Genus: Gordonia (ex Tsukamura 1971) Stackebrandt et al. 1989

Species
- See text.

Synonyms
- "Gordona" Tsukamura 1971; Gordona (ex Tsukamura 1971) Stackebrandt et al. 1989

Genus of bacteria

Gordonia is a genus of gram-positive to gram-variable, aerobic, catalase-positive bacterium in the Actinomycetota, closely related to the Rhodococcus, Mycobacterium, Skermania, and Nocardia genera. Gordonia bacteria are non-motile, and non-sporulating. Gordonia is from the same lineage that includes Mycobacterium tuberculosis. The genus was discovered by Tsukamura in 1971 and named after American bacteriologist Ruth Gordon. Many species are often found in the soil, while other species have been isolated from aquatic environments. Some species have been associated with problems like sludge bulking and foaming in wastewater treatment plants. Gordonia species are rarely known to cause infections in humans.

Some pathogenic instances of Gordonia have been reported to cause skin and soft tissue infections, including bacteremia and cutaneous infections. Though infections are generally treated with antibiotics, surgical procedures are sometimes used to contain infections. Some investigations have found that 28 °C is the ideal temperature for the growth of Gordonia bacteria. Gordonia species often have high G-C base pair contents in DNA, ranging from 63% to 69%.

Some species of Gordonia, such as Gordonia rubripertincta, produce colonies that have a bright orange or orange-red color.

Some strains of Gordonia have recently garnered interest in the biotechnology industry due to their ability to degrade environmental pollutants.

== Cases of pathogenicity ==
Gordonia bronchialis has occasionally shown pathogenicity, infecting sternal wounds from surgery. However, since G. bronchialis infections can present with minimal and mild symptoms, few reports of G. bronchialis infections have been documented.

Gordonia can infect immunocompetent and immunocompromised individuals.

== Environmental applications ==
Gordonia species are able to degrade various environmental pollutants toxins and other natural compounds that cannot regularly be biodegraded. Two common materials, natural and synthetic isoprene rubber (cis-1,4-polyisoprene), can be biodegraded and used as a carbon and energy source by Gordonia. Gordonia are commonly detected in activated sludge wastewater treatment plants, where they along with other mycolic acid containing actinomycetes are well known contributors to sludge foaming issues that impede biomass settling and process performance.

== Gordonia as a bacteriophage host ==
Gordonia species are also being studied as hosts to bacteriophages, or bacteria-parasitizing viruses. Because of their relatedness to Mycobacterium, Gordonia were used as hosts in the SEA-PHAGES project, greatly contributing to the number of isolated Gordonia phages. According to the Actinobacteriophage Database PhagesDb.org, more than 2,806 Gordonia-infecting types of bacteriophages have been identified as of April 26, 2023. Research with bacteriophages parasitizing Gordonia and other genera can be used to develop bacteriophage therapies for drug-resistant human, animal, and plant bacterial infections; contamination prevention in food processing facilities; targeted gene delivery; and more.

== Species ==
Gordonia comprises the following species:

- G. aichiensis corrig. (Tsukamura 1983) Klatte et al. 1994
- G. alkaliphila Cha and Cha 2013
- G. alkanivorans Kummer et al. 1999
- G. amarae corrig. (Lechevalier and Lechevalier 1974) Klatte et al. 1994
- G. amicalis Kim et al. 2000
- G. araii Kageyama et al. 2006
- G. asplenii Suriyachadkun et al. 2021
- "G. australis" Schneider et al. 2008
- G. bronchialis corrig. (Tsukamura 1971) Stackebrandt et al. 1989
- G. caeni Srinivasan et al. 2012
- G. cholesterolivorans Drzyzga et al. 2009
- G. crocea Tamura et al. 2020
- G. defluvii Soddell et al. 2006
- G. desulfuricans Kim et al. 1999
- G. didemni de Menezes et al. 2016
- G. effusa Kageyama et al. 2006
- G. hankookensis Park et al. 2009
- G. hirsuta corrig. Klatte et al. 1996
- G. hongkongensis Tsang et al. 2016
- G. humi Kämpfer et al. 2011
- G. hydrophobica corrig. Bendinger et al. 1995
- G. insulae Kim et al. 2020
- G. iterans Kang et al. 2014
- "G. jacobaea" De Miguel et al. 2000
- G. jinghuaiqii Zhang et al. 2021
- G. jinhuaensis Li et al. 2014
- G. lacunae Le Roes et al. 2009
- G. malaquae Yassin et al. 2007
- G. mangrovi Xie et al. 2020
- G. namibiensis Brandão et al. 2002
- G. neofelifaecis Liu et al. 2011
- G. oryzae Muangham et al. 2019
- G. otitidis Iida et al. 2005
- G. paraffinivorans Xue et al. 2003
- G. phosphorivorans Kämpfer et al. 2013
- G. phthalatica Jin et al. 2017
- G. polyisoprenivorans Linos et al. 1999
- "G. pseudoamarae" Batinovic et al. 2021
- G. rhizosphera Takeuchi and Hatano 1998
- G. rubripertincta corrig. (Hefferan 1904) Stackebrandt et al. 1989
- G. sediminis Sangkanu et al. 2019
- G. shandongensis Luo et al. 2007
- G. sihwensis Kim et al. 2003
- G. sinesedis Maldonado et al. 2003
- G. soli Shen et al. 2006
- G. spumicola Tamura et al. 2020
- G. sputi corrig. (Tsukamura and Yano 1985) Stackebrandt et al. 1989
- G. terrae corrig. (Tsukamura 1971) Stackebrandt et al. 1989
- "G. terrea" Stobdan et al. 2008
- G. westfalica Linos et al. 2002
- G. zhaorongruii Zhang et al. 2021

== See also ==
- Unicellular organism
- Gram-positive bacteria
- Gordonia sp. nov. Q8
