= Pseudokineococcus basanitobsidens =

Scientific classification
- Domain: Bacteria
- Kingdom: Bacillati
- Phylum: Actinomycetota
- Class: Actinomycetes
- Order: Kineosporiales
- Family: Kineosporiaceae
- Genus: Pseudokineococcus
- Species: P. basanitobsidens

Binomial name
- Pseudokineococcus basanitobsidens Lee et al. 2017

Type strain
- DSM 103726; KCCM 43221; SKC1-2

Species of bacterium

Pseudokineococcus basanitobsidens is a Gram-positive, aerobic and non-spore-forming bacterium from the genus of Pseudokineococcus which has been isolated from a volcanic rock from Seobjikoj in Korea.
