= Catenulispora pinisilvae =

Scientific classification
- Domain: Bacteria
- Kingdom: Bacillati
- Phylum: Actinomycetota
- Class: Actinomycetes
- Order: Catenulisporales
- Family: Catenulisporaceae
- Genus: Catenulispora
- Species: C. pinisilvae

Binomial name
- Catenulispora pinisilvae Swiecimska et al. 2020

Type strain
- NH11

Species of bacterium

Catenulispora pinisilvae is a bacterium from the genus of Catenulispora which has been isolated from soil from a pine forest near Toruń in Poland.
