= Gordonia alkaliphila =

Scientific classification
- Domain: Bacteria
- Kingdom: Bacillati
- Phylum: Actinomycetota
- Class: Actinomycetes
- Order: Mycobacteriales
- Family: Gordoniaceae
- Genus: Gordonia
- Species: G. alkaliphila

Binomial name
- Gordonia alkaliphila Cha and Cha 2013

Type strain
- JCM 18077, KACC 16561, CJ10

Species of bacterium

Gordonia alkaliphila is a Gram-positive, aerobic and non-motile bacterium from the genus of Gordonia which has been isolated from tidal flat sediments from the Yellow Sea in Korea.
