= Dietzia natronolimnaea =

Scientific classification
- Domain: Bacteria
- Kingdom: Bacillati
- Phylum: Actinomycetota
- Class: Actinomycetes
- Order: Mycobacteriales
- Family: Dietziaceae
- Genus: Dietzia
- Species: D. natronolimnaea

Binomial name
- Dietzia natronolimnaea corrig. Duckworth et al. 1999

Species of bacterium

Dietzia natronolimnaea is an alkaliphilic, aerobic, organotrophic bacteria, with type strain 15LN1 (= CBS 107.95).
