= Gordonia alkanivorans =

Scientific classification
- Domain: Bacteria
- Kingdom: Bacillati
- Phylum: Actinomycetota
- Class: Actinomycetes
- Order: Mycobacteriales
- Family: Gordoniaceae
- Genus: Gordonia
- Species: G. alkanivorans

Binomial name
- Gordonia alkanivorans Kummer et al. 1999

Type strain
- 2102-488, CIP 106363, DSM 44369, HKI 0136, IFM 10352, IFO 16433, JCM 10677, KCTC 9951, NBRC 16433, NCIMB 13615

Synonyms
- Gordonia nitida Yoon et al. 2000

Species of bacterium

Gordonia alkanivorans is a bacterium from the genus of Gordonia which has been isolated from soil which was contaminated with tar and phenol in Rositz in Germany. Gordonia alkanivorans has the ability to metabolize hexadecane. The strain RIPI90A of Gordonia alkanivorans can desulfurize dibenzothiophene.
