= Angustibacter luteus =

Scientific classification
- Domain: Bacteria
- Kingdom: Bacillati
- Phylum: Actinomycetota
- Class: Actinomycetes
- Order: Kineosporiales
- Family: Kineosporiaceae
- Genus: Angustibacter
- Species: A. luteus

Binomial name
- Angustibacter luteus Tamura et al. 2010

Type strain
- JCM 17683; KACC 14249; NBRC 105387; TT07R-79

Species of bacterium

Angustibacter luteus is a bacterium from the genus of Angustibacter which has been isolated from subarctic forest soil.
