= Dietzia lutea =

Scientific classification
- Domain: Bacteria
- Kingdom: Bacillati
- Phylum: Actinomycetota
- Class: Actinomycetes
- Order: Mycobacteriales
- Family: Dietziaceae
- Genus: Dietzia
- Species: D. lutea

Binomial name
- Dietzia lutea Li et al. 2011

Type strain
- CCTCC AA 207008, DSM 45074, KCTC 19232, YIM 80766

Species of bacterium

Dietzia lutea is a bacterium from the genus Dietzia which has been isolated from desert soil in Egypt.
