= Tsukamurella sinensis =

Scientific classification
- Domain: Bacteria
- Kingdom: Bacillati
- Phylum: Actinomycetota
- Class: Actinomycetes
- Order: Mycobacteriales
- Family: Tsukamurellaceae
- Genus: Tsukamurella
- Species: T. sinensis

Binomial name
- Tsukamurella sinensis Teng et al. 2016

Type strain
- DSM 100207, JCM 30714, HKU51

Species of bacterium

Tsukamurella sinensis is a bacterium from the genus of Tsukamurella which has been isolated from a patient from the Queen Mary Hospital in Hong Kong.
