= Dietzia timorensis =

Scientific classification
- Domain: Bacteria
- Kingdom: Bacillati
- Phylum: Actinomycetota
- Class: Actinomycetes
- Order: Mycobacteriales
- Family: Dietziaceae
- Genus: Dietzia
- Species: D. timorensis

Binomial name
- Dietzia timorensis Yamamura et al. 2010

Type strain
- BTCC B-560, ID5-A0528, NBRC 104184

Species of bacterium

Dietzia timorensis is a bacterium from the genus Dietzia which has been isolated from soil from Kupang from West Timor, Indonesia.
