= Pseudokineococcus marinus =

Scientific classification
- Domain: Bacteria
- Kingdom: Bacillati
- Phylum: Actinomycetota
- Class: Actinomycetes
- Order: Kineosporiales
- Family: Kineosporiaceae
- Genus: Pseudokineococcus
- Species: P. marinus

Binomial name
- Pseudokineococcus marinus (Lee 2006) Jurado et al. 2011

Type strain
- JCM 14547; KCCM 42250; NBRC 102111

Synonyms
- Kineococcus marinus Lee 2006

Species of bacterium

Pseudokineococcus marinus is a Gram-positive, aerobic, non-spore-forming and motile bacterium from the genus of Pseudokineococcus which has been isolated from marine sediments from the coast of Jeju in Korea.
