= Gordonia paraffinivorans =

Scientific classification
- Domain: Bacteria
- Kingdom: Bacillati
- Phylum: Actinomycetota
- Class: Actinomycetes
- Order: Mycobacteriales
- Family: Gordoniaceae
- Genus: Gordonia
- Species: G. paraffinivorans

Binomial name
- Gordonia paraffinivorans Xue et al. 2003

Type strain
- AS 4.1730, BCRC 16372, CCRC 16372, CGMCC 4.1730, CIP 108331, DSM 44604, HD321, IFM 10631, JCM 12461

Species of bacterium

Gordonia paraffinivorans is a bacterium from the genus Gordonia which has been isolated from the Daqing Oil Field in China. Gordonia paraffinivorans has the ability to degrade hydrocarbon.
