= Catenulispora subtropica =

Scientific classification
- Domain: Bacteria
- Kingdom: Bacillati
- Phylum: Actinomycetota
- Class: Actinomycetes
- Order: Catenulisporales
- Family: Catenulisporaceae
- Genus: Catenulispora
- Species: C. subtropica

Binomial name
- Catenulispora subtropica Tamura et al. 2008

Type strain
- TT 99-48

Species of bacterium

Catenulispora subtropica is a bacterium from the genus of Catenulispora which has been isolated from soil from a paddy field from the Iriomote Island.
