= Gordonia jinhuaensis =

Scientific classification
- Domain: Bacteria
- Kingdom: Bacillati
- Phylum: Actinomycetota
- Class: Actinomycetes
- Order: Mycobacteriales
- Family: Gordoniaceae
- Genus: Gordonia
- Species: G. jinhuaensis

Binomial name
- Gordonia jinhuaensis Li et al. 2014

Type strain
- CGMCC 1.12827, ZYR51, NBRC 110001, NBRL B-59111

Species of bacterium

Gordonia jinhuaensis is a Gram-positive, aerobic, rod-shaped and non-motile bacterium from the genus Gordonia which has been isolated from pharmaceutical wastewater from Jinhua in China.
