= Gordonia polyisoprenivorans =

Scientific classification
- Domain: Bacteria
- Kingdom: Bacillati
- Phylum: Actinomycetota
- Class: Actinomycetes
- Order: Mycobacteriales
- Family: Gordoniaceae
- Genus: Gordonia
- Species: G. polyisoprenivorans

Binomial name
- Gordonia polyisoprenivorans Linos et al. 1999

Species of bacterium

Gordonia polyisoprenivorans is a rubber-degrading actinomycete first isolated from an automobile tyre.
