= Tsukamurella pulmonis =

Scientific classification
- Domain: Bacteria
- Kingdom: Bacillati
- Phylum: Actinomycetota
- Class: Actinomycetes
- Order: Mycobacteriales
- Family: Tsukamurellaceae
- Genus: Tsukamurella
- Species: T. pulmonis

Binomial name
- Tsukamurella pulmonis Yassin et al. 1996

Type strain
- ATCC 700081; CCUG 35732; CIP 104791; DSM 44142; IFM 809; IMMIB D-1321; JCM 10111; KCTC 9963; PCM 2578

Synonyms
- Tsukamurella spongiae Olson et al. 2007

Species of bacterium

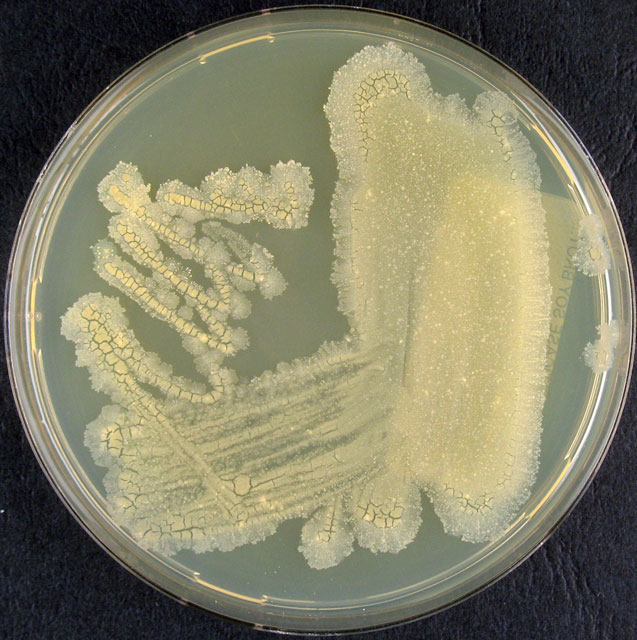
Pastel yellow of Tsukamurella pulmonis

Tsukamurella pulmonis is a Gram-positive and aerobic bacterium from the genus Tsukamurella which has been isolated from the sputum from a patient with lung tuberculosis in Germany.

== Characteristic as secondary metabolites production inducer by actinomycetes ==
Tsukamurella pulmonis TP-B0596 induced production of anti-fungal 5aTHQs (5-Alkyl-1,2,3,4-tetrahydroquinolines) and anti-bacterial Streptoaminals (lipidic [5,5]-Spirohemiaminals) by Streptomyces sp. HEK616. T. pulmonis TP-B0596 was also shown to induce production of secondary metabolites; dracolactams by Micromonospora sp. HEK797, niizalactams by Streptomyces sp. NZ-6, chojalactones by Streptomyces sp. CJ-5, and Alchivemycin A by Streptomyces sp. S-522.
