= Kineococcus radiotolerans =

Scientific classification
- Domain: Bacteria
- Kingdom: Bacillati
- Phylum: Actinomycetota
- Class: Actinomycetes
- Order: Kineosporiales
- Family: Kineosporiaceae
- Genus: Kineococcus
- Species: K. radiotolerans

Binomial name
- Kineococcus radiotolerans Phillips et al. 2002

Type strain
- SRS30216^{T} ATCC BAA-149^{T} DSM 14245^{T}

Species of bacterium

Kineococcus radiotolerans is a radiation-resistant, motile, coccus-shaped, gram-positive bacterium.
