= Catenulispora acidiphila =

Scientific classification
- Domain: Bacteria
- Kingdom: Bacillati
- Phylum: Actinomycetota
- Class: Actinomycetes
- Order: Catenulisporales
- Family: Catenulisporaceae
- Genus: Catenulispora
- Species: C. acidiphila

Binomial name
- Catenulispora acidiphila Busti et al. 2006

Type strain
- ID139908

Species of bacterium

Catenulispora acidiphila is a Gram-positive bacterium from the genus of Catenulispora which has been isolated from forest soil from Gerenzano in Italy.
