= Dietzia kunjamensis =

Scientific classification
- Domain: Bacteria
- Kingdom: Bacillati
- Phylum: Actinomycetota
- Class: Actinomycetes
- Order: Mycobacteriales
- Family: Dietziaceae
- Genus: Dietzia
- Species: D. kunjamensis

Binomial name
- Dietzia kunjamensis Mayilraj et al. 2006

Type strain
- BCRC 16834; CCRC 16834; CIP 109330; DSM 44907; JCM 13325; K30-10; MTCC 7007

Subspecies
- D. k. subsp. schimae (Li et al. 2008) Nouioui et al. 2018; D. k. subsp. kunjamensis (Mayilraj et al. 2006) Nouioui et al. 2018

Synonyms
- Dietzia schimae Li et al. 2008

Species of bacterium

Dietzia kunjamensis is a bacterium from the genus Dietzia which has been isolated from soil from the desert of the Himalayas.
