= Tsukamurella hongkongensis =

Scientific classification
- Domain: Bacteria
- Kingdom: Bacillati
- Phylum: Actinomycetota
- Class: Actinomycetes
- Order: Mycobacteriales
- Family: Tsukamurellaceae
- Genus: Tsukamurella
- Species: T. hongkongensis

Binomial name
- Tsukamurella hongkongensis Teng et al. 2016

Type strain
- DSM 100208, JCM 30715, HKU52, HKU53

Species of bacterium

Tsukamurella hongkongensis is a Gram-positive, aerobic, non-spore-forming and non-motile bacterium from the genus of Tsukamurella. It has been isolated from a human clinical sample in the Queen Mary Hospital in Hong Kong.
