= Dietzia alimentaria =

Scientific classification
- Domain: Bacteria
- Kingdom: Bacillati
- Phylum: Actinomycetota
- Class: Actinomycetes
- Order: Mycobacteriales
- Family: Dietziaceae
- Genus: Dietzia
- Species: D. alimentaria

Binomial name
- Dietzia alimentaria Kim et al. 2011

Type strain
- JCM 16360, KACC 21126, 72

Species of bacterium

Dietzia alimentaria is a Gram-positive and non-motile bacterium from the genus Dietzia which has been isolated from salt-fermented seafood from Sokcho in Korea.
