= Tsukamurella pseudospumae =

Scientific classification
- Domain: Bacteria
- Kingdom: Bacillati
- Phylum: Actinomycetota
- Class: Actinomycetes
- Order: Mycobacteriales
- Family: Tsukamurellaceae
- Genus: Tsukamurella
- Species: T. pseudospumae

Binomial name
- Tsukamurella pseudospumae Nam et al. 2004

Type strain
- CIP 108828, DSM 44118, IFM 10600, JCM 13375, N1176, NCIMB 13963

Synonyms
- Tsukamurella sunchonensis Seong et al. 2008

Species of bacterium

Tsukamurella pseudospumae is a bacterium from the genus Tsukamurella which has been isolated from activated sludge foam from an activated sludge treatment plant in England.

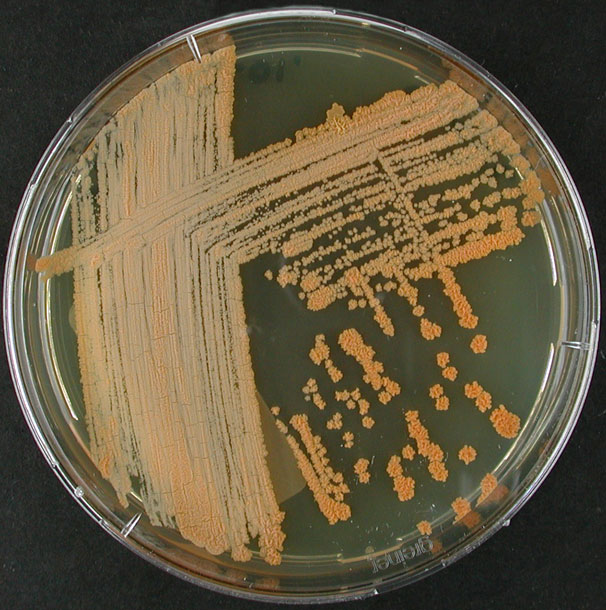
Tsukamurella pseudospumae in a petri dish
