= Cryptosporangium mongoliense =

Scientific classification
- Domain: Bacteria
- Kingdom: Bacillati
- Phylum: Actinomycetota
- Class: Actinomycetes
- Order: Cryptosporangiales
- Family: Cryptosporangiaceae
- Genus: Cryptosporangium
- Species: C. mongoliense

Binomial name
- Cryptosporangium mongoliense Ara et al. 2012

Type strain
- NBRC 105887; VTCC D9-27; MN08-A0264

Species of bacterium

Cryptosporangium mongoliense is a Gram-positive, aerobic and non-motile bacterium species from the genus of Cryptosporangium which has been isolated from soil from Mongolia.
