= Cryptosporangium cibodasense =

Scientific classification
- Domain: Bacteria
- Kingdom: Bacillati
- Phylum: Actinomycetota
- Class: Actinomycetes
- Order: Cryptosporangiales
- Family: Cryptosporangiaceae
- Genus: Cryptosporangium
- Species: C. cibodasense

Binomial name
- Cryptosporangium cibodasense Nurkanto et al. 2015

Type strain
- InaCC A457; NBRC 110976; LIPI11-2-Ac046

Species of bacterium

Cryptosporangium cibodasense is a bacterium species from the genus of Cryptosporangium which has been isolated from leaf litter from the Cibodas Botanical Garden in Indonesia.
