= Tsukamurella strandjordii =

Scientific classification
- Domain: Bacteria
- Kingdom: Bacillati
- Phylum: Actinomycetota
- Class: Actinomycetes
- Order: Mycobacteriales
- Family: Tsukamurellaceae
- Genus: Tsukamurella
- Species: T. strandjordii

Binomial name
- Tsukamurella strandjordii corrig. Kattar et al. 2002

Type strain
- 32–92, ATCC BAA-173, CIP 107755, DSM 44573, IFM 10184, JCM 11487, KCTC 19178, KCTC 9964

Synonyms
- Tsukamurella strandjordae Kattar et al. 2002

Species of bacterium

Tsukamurella strandjordii is a Gram-positive and aerobic bacterium from the genus of Tsukamurella which has been isolated from the blood of a young girl with acute mycelogenous leukemia.
