= Benzoate 1,2-dioxygenase =

Class of enzymes

benzoate 1,2-dioxygenase

Identifiers
- EC no.: 1.14.12.10
- CAS no.: 9059-18-1

Databases
- BRENDA: enzyme data
- ExPASy: NiceZyme view
- KEGG: enzyme entry
- MetaCyc: metabolic pathway
- Rhea: reactions
- PDB structures: RCSB PDB PDBe PDBsum
- Gene Ontology: AmiGO / QuickGO
Search
- PMC: articles
- PubMed: articles
- NCBI: proteins

In enzymology, a benzoate 1,2-dioxygenase (EC 1.14.12.10) is an enzyme that catalyzes the chemical reaction

benzoate + NADH + H^{+} + O_{2} $\rightleftharpoons$ 1,2-dihydroxycyclohexa-3,5-diene-1-carboxylate + NAD^{+}

The 4 substrates of this enzyme are benzoate, NADH, H^{+}, and O_{2}, whereas its two products are 1,2-dihydroxycyclohexa-3,5-diene-1-carboxylate and NAD^{+}.

This enzyme belongs to the family of oxidoreductases, specifically those acting on paired donors, with O2 as oxidant and incorporation or reduction of oxygen. The oxygen incorporated need not be derived from O2 with NADH or NADPH as one donor, and incorporation of two atoms o oxygen into the other donor. The systematic name of this enzyme class is benzoate,NADH:oxygen oxidoreductase (1,2-hydroxylating). Other names in common use include benzoate hydroxylase, benzoate hydroxylase, benzoic hydroxylase, benzoate dioxygenase, benzoate,NADH:oxygen oxidoreductase (1,2-hydroxylating,, and decarboxylating) [incorrect]. This enzyme participates in benzoate degradation via hydroxylation and benzoate degradation via coa ligation. It has 3 cofactors: FAD, Iron, and Sulfur.
