= Benzaldehyde dehydrogenase (NAD+) =

Enzyme

benzaldehyde dehydrogenase (NAD+)

Identifiers
- EC no.: 1.2.1.28
- CAS no.: 37250-93-4

Databases
- IntEnz: IntEnz view
- BRENDA: BRENDA entry
- ExPASy: NiceZyme view
- KEGG: KEGG entry
- MetaCyc: metabolic pathway
- PRIAM: profile
- PDB structures: RCSB PDB PDBe PDBsum
- Gene Ontology: AmiGO / QuickGO
Search
- PMC: articles
- PubMed: articles
- NCBI: proteins

In enzymology, benzaldehyde dehydrogenase (NAD+) (EC 1.2.1.28) is an enzyme that catalyzes the chemical reaction

benzaldehyde
+ NAD^{+}
H_{2}O
H^{+}
H_{2}O
H^{+}
benzoic acid
+ NADH

The three substrates of this enzyme are benzaldehyde, oxidised nicotinamide adenine dinucleotide (NAD^{+}), and water. Its products are benzoic acid, reduced NADH, and a proton.

This enzyme belongs to the family of oxidoreductases, specifically those acting on the aldehyde or oxo group of donor with NAD+ or NADP+ as acceptor. The systematic name of this enzyme class is benzaldehyde:NAD+ oxidoreductase. Other names in common use include benzaldehyde (NAD+) dehydrogenase, and benzaldehyde dehydrogenase (NAD+). This enzyme participates in benzoate degradation via hydroxylation and toluene and xylene degradation.
