= 1,6-dihydroxycyclohexa-2,4-diene-1-carboxylate dehydrogenase =

Class of enzymes

Identifiers
- EC no.: 1.3.1.25
- CAS no.: 60496-16-4

Databases
- IntEnz: IntEnz view
- BRENDA: BRENDA entry
- ExPASy: NiceZyme view
- KEGG: KEGG entry
- MetaCyc: metabolic pathway
- PRIAM: profile
- PDB structures: RCSB PDB PDBe PDBsum
- Gene Ontology: AmiGO / QuickGO
Search
- PMC: articles
- PubMed: articles
- NCBI: proteins

In enzymology, 1,6-dihydroxycyclohexa-2,4-diene-1-carboxylate dehydrogenase (EC 1.3.1.25) is an enzyme that catalyzes the chemical reaction

1,6-dihydroxycyclohexa-2,4-dienecarboxylate
+ NAD^{+}
CO_{2} + H^{+}
CO_{2} + H^{+}
catechol
+ NADH

The two substrates of this enzyme are (1R,6R)-1,6-dihydroxycyclohexa-2,4-diene-1-carboxylic acid and oxidised nicotinamide adenine dinucleotide (NAD^{+}). Its products are catechol, carbon dioxide, reduced NADH, and a proton.

This enzyme belongs to the family of oxidoreductases, specifically those acting on the CH-CH group of donor with NAD+ or NADP+ as acceptor. The systematic name of this enzyme class is (1R,6R)-1,6-dihydroxycyclohexa-2,4-diene-1-carboxylate:NAD+ oxidoreductase (decarboxylating). Other names in common use include 3,5-cyclohexadiene-1,2-diol-1-carboxylate dehydrogenase, 3,5-cyclohexadiene-1,2-diol-1-carboxylic acid dehydrogenase, dihydrodihydroxybenzoate dehydrogenase, DHBDH, cis-1,2-dihydroxycyclohexa-3,5-diene-1-carboxylate dehydrogenase, 2-hydro-1,2-dihydroxybenzoate dehydrogenase, cis-1,2-dihydroxycyclohexa-3,5-diene-1-carboxylate:NAD+, oxidoreductase, and dihydrodihydroxybenzoate dehydrogenase. This enzyme participates in benzoate degradation via hydroxylation and benzoate degradation via coa ligation.
