= 4-hydroxy-4-methyl-2-oxoglutarate aldolase =

Class of enzymes

Identifiers
- EC no.: 4.1.3.17
- CAS no.: 37290-65-6

Databases
- IntEnz: IntEnz view
- BRENDA: BRENDA entry
- ExPASy: NiceZyme view
- KEGG: KEGG entry
- MetaCyc: metabolic pathway
- PRIAM: profile
- PDB structures: RCSB PDB PDBe PDBsum
- Gene Ontology: AmiGO / QuickGO
Search
- PMC: articles
- PubMed: articles
- NCBI: proteins

The enzyme 4-hydroxy-4-methyl-2-oxoglutarate aldolase (EC 4.1.3.17) catalyzes the chemical reaction

4-hydroxy-4-methyl-2-oxoglutarate $\rightleftharpoons$ 2 pyruvate

This enzyme belongs to the family of lyases, specifically the oxo-acid-lyases, which cleave carbon-carbon bonds. The systematic name of this enzyme class is 4-hydroxy-4-methyl-2-oxoglutarate pyruvate-lyase (pyruvate-forming). Other names in common use include pyruvate aldolase, gamma-methyl-gamma-hydroxy-alpha-ketoglutaric aldolase, 4-hydroxy-4-methyl-2-ketoglutarate aldolase, and 4-hydroxy-4-methyl-2-oxoglutarate pyruvate-lyase. This enzyme participates in benzoate degradation via hydroxylation and c5-branched dibasic acid metabolism.
