= 4-oxalmesaconate hydratase =

Class of enzymes

Identifiers
- EC no.: 4.2.1.83
- CAS no.: 85204-95-1

Databases
- IntEnz: IntEnz view
- BRENDA: BRENDA entry
- ExPASy: NiceZyme view
- KEGG: KEGG entry
- MetaCyc: metabolic pathway
- PRIAM: profile
- PDB structures: RCSB PDB PDBe PDBsum
- Gene Ontology: AmiGO / QuickGO
Search
- PMC: articles
- PubMed: articles
- NCBI: proteins

The enzyme 4-oxalmesaconate hydratase (EC 4.2.1.83) catalyzes the chemical reaction

2-hydroxy-4-oxobutane-1,2,4-tricarboxylate $\rightleftharpoons$ (1E,3E)-4-hydroxybuta-1,3-diene-1,2,4-tricarboxylate + H_{2}O

This enzyme belongs to the family of lyases, specifically the hydro-lyases, which cleave carbon-oxygen bonds. The systematic name of this enzyme class is (1E,3E)-4-hydroxybuta-1,3-diene-1,2,4-tricarboxylate 1,2-hydro-lyase (2-hydroxy-4-oxobutane-1,2,4-tricarboxylate-forming). Other names in common use include 4-carboxy-2-oxohexenedioate hydratase, 4-carboxy-2-oxobutane-1,2,4-tricarboxylate 2,3-hydro-lyase, oxalmesaconate hydratase, γ-oxalmesaconate hydratase, 4-carboxy-2-oxohexenedioate hydratase, and 2-hydroxy-4-oxobutane-1,2,4-tricarboxylate 2,3-hydro-lyase. This enzyme participates in benzoate degradation via hydroxylation.
