= Pseudokineococcus =

Scientific classification
- Domain: Bacteria
- Kingdom: Bacillati
- Phylum: Actinomycetota
- Class: Actinomycetes
- Order: Kineosporiales
- Family: Kineosporiaceae
- Genus: Pseudokineococcus; Jurado et al. 2011

Type species
- Pseudokineococcus lusitanus Jurado et al. 2011

Species
- P. basanitobsidens; P. galaxeicola; P. lusitanus; P. marinus

Genus of bacteria

Pseudokineococcus is a genus of bacteria from the family of Kineosporiaceae.

== Phylogeny ==
The currently accepted taxonomy is based on the List of Prokaryotic names with Standing in Nomenclature (LPSN) and National Center for Biotechnology Information (NCBI)

16S rRNA based LTP_08_2023

- Pseudokineococcus
  - P. galaxeicola Li et al. 2020
  - - P. marinus (Lee 2006) Jurado et al. 2011
    - - P. basanitobsidens Lee et al. 2017
      - 'P. lusitanus Jurado et al. 2011

120 marker proteins based GTDB 08-RS214

- Pseudokineococcus
  - P. lusitanus
  - P. marinus
