= Angustibacter =

Scientific classification
- Domain: Bacteria
- Kingdom: Bacillati
- Phylum: Actinomycetota
- Class: Actinomycetes
- Order: Kineosporiales
- Family: Kineosporiaceae
- Genus: Angustibacter; Tamura et al. 2010

Type species
- Angustibacter luteus Tamura et al. 2010

Species
- A. aerolatus; A. luteus; A. peucedani; A. speluncae

Genus of bacteria

Angustibacter is a genus of bacteria from the family Kineosporiaceae.

== Phylogeny ==
The currently accepted taxonomy is based on the List of Prokaryotic names with Standing in Nomenclature (LPSN) and National Center for Biotechnology Information (NCBI)

16S rRNA based LTP_08_2023

- Angustibacter
  - A. speluncae Ko and Lee 2017
  - - A. aerolatus Kim et al. 2013
    - - A. luteus Tamura et al. 2010
      - A. peucedani Lee 2013
