= 2,3-dihydroxybenzoate 3,4-dioxygenase =

Class of enzymes

Identifiers
- EC no.: 1.13.11.14
- CAS no.: 9032-31-9

Databases
- IntEnz: IntEnz view
- BRENDA: BRENDA entry
- ExPASy: NiceZyme view
- KEGG: KEGG entry
- MetaCyc: metabolic pathway
- PRIAM: profile
- PDB structures: RCSB PDB PDBe PDBsum
- Gene Ontology: AmiGO / QuickGO
Search
- PMC: articles
- PubMed: articles
- NCBI: proteins

In enzymology, a 2,3-dihydroxybenzoate 3,4-dioxygenase (EC 1.13.11.14) is an enzyme that catalyzes the chemical reaction

2,3-dihydroxybenzoate + O_{2} $\rightleftharpoons$ 3-carboxy-2-hydroxymuconate semialdehyde

Thus, the two substrates of this enzyme are 2,3-dihydroxybenzoate and O_{2}, whereas its product is 3-carboxy-2-hydroxymuconate semialdehyde.

This enzyme belongs to the family of oxidoreductases, specifically those acting on single donors with O_{2} as oxidant and incorporation of two atoms of oxygen into the substrate (oxygenases). The oxygen incorporated need not be derived from O_{2}. The systematic name of this enzyme class is 2,3-dihydroxybenzoate:oxygen 3,4-oxidoreductase (decyclizing). Other names in common use include o-pyrocatechuate oxygenase, 2,3-dihydroxybenzoate 1,2-dioxygenase, 2,3-dihydroxybenzoic oxygenase, and 2,3-dihydroxybenzoate oxygenase. This enzyme participates in benzoate degradation via hydroxylation.
