= Actinospica =

Scientific classification
- Domain: Bacteria
- Kingdom: Bacillati
- Phylum: Actinomycetota
- Class: Actinomycetes
- Order: Catenulisporales
- Family: Actinospicaceae
- Genus: Actinospica; Cavaletti et al. 2006

Type species
- Actinospica robiniae Cavaletti et al. 2006

Species
- A. acidiphila; A. acidithermotolerans; A. durhamensis; A. robiniae

Genus of bacteria

Actinospica is a genus in the phylum Actinomycetota (Bacteria).

== Etymology ==
The name Actinospica derives from:
Greek noun aktis, aktinos (ἀκτίς, ἀκτῖνος), a beam (=an actinomycete-like bacterium); Latin feminine gender noun spica, tuft; Neo-Latin feminine gender noun Actinospica, an actinomycete with tufts of aerial hyphae.

== Phylogeny ==
The currently accepted taxonomy is based on the List of Prokaryotic names with Standing in Nomenclature (LPSN) and National Center for Biotechnology Information (NCBI).

16S rRNA based LTP_10_2024

- Actinospica
  - A. durhamensis Golinksa 2015
  - - A. robiniae Cavaletti et al. 2006
    - - Actinocrinis puniceicyclus Kim et al. 2017
      - - A. acidiphila Cavaletti et al. 2006
        - A. acidithermotolerans Cavaletti et al. 2006

120 marker proteins based GTDB 10-RS226

- Actinospica
  - A. acidithermotolerans
  - - A. durhamensis
    - A. robiniae

== Species ==
The genus contains 4 species (including basonyms and synonyms), namely

- A. acidiphila Cavaletti et al. 2006 (Neo-Latin noun acidum (from Latin adjective acidus, sour), an acid; Neo-Latin adjective philus from Greek adjective philos (φίλος) meaning friend, loving; Neo-Latin feminine gender adjective acidiphila, acid-loving.)
- A. robiniae Cavaletti et al. 2006 (Type species of the genus).; Neo-Latin feminine gender noun Robinia, a genus of tree (as it was isolated from Robinia pseudoacacia); Neo-Latin feminine gender genitive case noun robiniae, of Robinia
