= Motilibacter =

Scientific classification
- Domain: Bacteria
- Kingdom: Bacillati
- Phylum: Actinomycetota
- Class: Actinomycetes
- Order: Motilibacterales
- Family: Motilibacteraceae; Lee 2013
- Genus: Motilibacter; Lee 2012

Type species
- Motilibacter peucedani Lee 2012

Species
- M. aurantiacus; M. deserti; M. peucedani; M. rhizosphaerae

Genus of bacteria

Motilibacter is a genus of bacteria from the class Actinomycetia.

== Phylogeny ==
The currently accepted taxonomy is based on the List of Prokaryotic names with Standing in Nomenclature (LPSN) and National Center for Biotechnology Information (NCBI).

16S rRNA based LTP_10_2024 and 120 marker proteins based GTDB 10-RS226

- Motilibacter
  - - M. aurantiacus Liu et al. 2021
    - M. deserti Liu et al. 2021
  - - M. peucedani Lee 2012
    - M. rhizosphaerae Lee 2013
