= Sporichthya =

Scientific classification
- Domain: Bacteria
- Kingdom: Bacillati
- Phylum: Actinomycetota
- Class: Actinomycetes
- Order: Sporichthyales
- Family: Sporichthyaceae
- Genus: Sporichthya; Lechevalier, Lechevalier & Holbert 1968

Type species
- Sporichthya polymorpha Lechevalier, Lechevalier & Holbert 1968

Species
- S. brevicatena; S. polymorpha

Genus of bacteria

Sporichthya is a genus of bacteria in the family Sporichthyaceae.

== Phylogeny ==
The currently accepted taxonomy is based on the List of Prokaryotic names with Standing in Nomenclature (LPSN) and National Center for Biotechnology Information (NCBI).

16S rRNA based LTP_10_2024

- Sporichthya
  - S. brevicatena Tamura et al. 1999
  - S. polymorpha Lechevalier, Lechevalier & Holbert 1968 (type sp.)

120 marker proteins based GTDB 10-RS226

- Sporichthya
  - S. brevicatena
  - S. polymorpha
