= Dietzia =

Scientific classification
- Domain: Bacteria
- Kingdom: Bacillati
- Phylum: Actinomycetota
- Class: Actinomycetes
- Order: Mycobacteriales
- Family: Dietziaceae; Rainey et al. 1997
- Genus: Dietzia; Rainey et al. 1995

Type species
- Dietzia maris (Nesterenko et al. 1982) Rainey et al. 1995

Species
- D. aerolata Kämpfer et al. 2010; D. alimentaria Kim et al. 2011; D. aurantiaca Kämpfer et al. 2012; D. cercidiphylli Li et al. 2008; "D. daqingensis" Brushkov and Fukuda 2007; D. kunjamensis Mayilraj et al. 2006; D. lutea Li et al. 2011; D. maris (Nesterenko et al. 1982) Rainey et al. 1995; "D. massiliensis" Olowo-Okere et al. 2021; D. natronolimnaea corrig. Duckworth et al. 1999; D. papillomatosis Jones et al. 2008; D. psychralcaliphila Yumoto et al. 2002; D. timorensis Yamamura et al. 2010

Genus of bacteria

Dietzia is a Gram-positive bacterial genus from the family Dietziaceae which occur in many different habitats including humans and animals. The species Dietzia maris is a human pathogen. The genus Dietzia is named after the American microbiologist Alma Dietz.
