= Lawsonella =

Scientific classification
- Domain: Bacteria
- Kingdom: Bacillati
- Phylum: Actinomycetota
- Class: Actinomycetes
- Order: Mycobacteriales
- Family: Lawsonellaceae; Nouioui et al. 2018
- Genus: Lawsonella; Bell et al. 2016
- Species: L. clevelandensis

Binomial name
- Lawsonella clevelandensis Bell et al. 2016

Type strain
- CCUG 66657; DSM 45743; X1036

Family of bacteria

Lawsonella clevelandensis is a species of Actinomycetota.
