= Segniliparus =

Scientific classification
- Domain: Bacteria
- Kingdom: Bacillati
- Phylum: Actinomycetota
- Class: Actinomycetes
- Order: Mycobacteriales
- Family: Segniliparaceae; Butler et al. 2005
- Genus: Segniliparus; Butler et al. 2005

Type species
- Segniliparus rotundus Butler et al. 2005

Species
- S. rotundus; S. rugosus

Family of bacteria

Segniliparus is a genus of Actinomycetota.

== Phylogeny ==
The currently accepted taxonomy is based on the List of Prokaryotic names with Standing in Nomenclature (LPSN) and National Center for Biotechnology Information (NCBI).

16S rRNA based LTP_10_2024

- Segniliparus
  - S. rotundus Butler et al. 2005
  - S. rugosus Butler et al. 2005

120 marker proteins based GTDB 10-RS226

- Segniliparus
  - S. rotundus
  - S. rugosus

== See also ==
- List of bacterial orders
- List of bacteria genera
