= Quadrisphaera =

Scientific classification
- Domain: Bacteria
- Kingdom: Bacillati
- Phylum: Actinomycetota
- Class: Actinomycetes
- Order: Kineosporiales
- Family: Kineosporiaceae
- Genus: Quadrisphaera; Maszenan et al. 2005

Type species
- Quadrisphaera granulorum Maszenan et al. 2005

Species
- Q. granulorum; Q. oryzae; Q. setariae

Genus of bacteria

Quadrisphaera is a Gram-positive genus of bacteria from the family of Kineosporiaceae.

== Phylogeny ==
The currently accepted taxonomy is based on the List of Prokaryotic names with Standing in Nomenclature (LPSN) and National Center for Biotechnology Information (NCBI)

16S rRNA based LTP_08_2023

- Quadrisphaera
  - Q. setariae Kim et al. 2022
  - - Q. granulorum Maszenan et al. 2005
    - Q. oryzae Muangham et al. 2020

120 marker proteins based GTDB 08-RS214

- Quadrisphaera
  - Q. setariae
  - Q. granulorum
