= Cryptosporangium =

Scientific classification
- Domain: Bacteria
- Kingdom: Bacillati
- Phylum: Actinomycetota
- Class: Actinomycetes
- Order: Cryptosporangiales
- Family: Cryptosporangiaceae
- Genus: Cryptosporangium; Tamura et al. 1998

Type species
- Cryptosporangium arvum Tamura et al. 1998

Species
- C. arvum; C. aurantiacum; C. cibodasense; C. eucalypti; C. japonicum; C. minutisporangium; C. mongoliense; C. phraense

Genus of bacteria

Cryptosporangium is a genus of bacteria in the phylum Actinomycetota.

== Etymology ==
The name Cryptosporangium derives from:
Gr . adj . kruptos, hidden; Neo-Latin noun sporangium [from Greek noun spora (σπορά), a seed (and in biology a spore), and Greek noun angeion (Latin transliteration angium), vessel], sporangium; Neo-Latin neuter gender noun Cryptosporangium, an organism with sporangia (spore containing vessels) covered or hidden by mycelium.

== Phylogeny ==
The currently accepted taxonomy is based on the List of Prokaryotic names with Standing in Nomenclature (LPSN) and National Center for Biotechnology Information (NCBI).

16S rRNA based LTP_10_2024

- Cryptosporangium
  - C. mongoliense Ara et al. 2012
  - - - C. arvum Tamura et al. 1998
      - C. phraense Suriyachadkun et al. 2020
    - - - C. cibodasense Nurkanto et al. 2015
        - C. eucalypti Himaman et al. 2017
      - - C. minutisporangium (Ruan et al. 1986) Tamura and Hatano 2001
        - - C. aurantiacum Ruan, Zhang & Jiang 1976 ex Tamura & Hatano 2001
          - C. japonicum Tamura et al. 1998

120 marker proteins based GTDB 10-RS226

- Cryptosporangium
  - - C. aurantiacum
    - C. minutisporangium
  - - C. phraense
    - - C. arvum
      - C. japonicum

== Etymology ==
- C. aurantiacum (ex Ruan et al. 1976) Tamura and Hatano 2001 (Neo-Latin neuter gender adjective aurantiacum, orange-coloured.)
- C. arvum Tamura et al. 1998 (Latin noun arvum, arable field, cultivated land, pertaining to isolate from arable land.)
- C. japonicum Tamura et al. 1998 (Neo-Latin neuter gender adjective japonicum, pertaining to Japan where the organisms were isolated.)
- C. minutisporangium (Ruan et al. 1986) Tamura and Hatano 2001 (Latin adjective minutus, little, small, minute; Neo-Latin noun sporangium [from Greek noun spora (σπορά), a seed (and in biology a spore), and Greek noun angeion (Latin transliteration angium), vessel], sporangium; Neo-Latin noun minutisporangium (nominative in apposition), the small sporangium.)

== See also ==
- Bacterial taxonomy
- List of bacterial orders
- List of bacteria genera
- Microbiology
