= Angustibacter speluncae =

Scientific classification
- Domain: Bacteria
- Kingdom: Bacillati
- Phylum: Actinomycetota
- Class: Actinomycetes
- Order: Kineosporiales
- Family: Kineosporiaceae
- Genus: Angustibacter
- Species: A. speluncae

Binomial name
- Angustibacter speluncae Ko and Lee 2017

Type strain
- YC2-19; YC2-20; DSM 103769; KCTC 39842

Species of bacterium

Angustibacter speluncae is a Gram-positive, strictly aerobic and motile bacterium from the genus of Angustibacter which has been isolated from a stalactite from the Yongcheon Cave in Korea.
