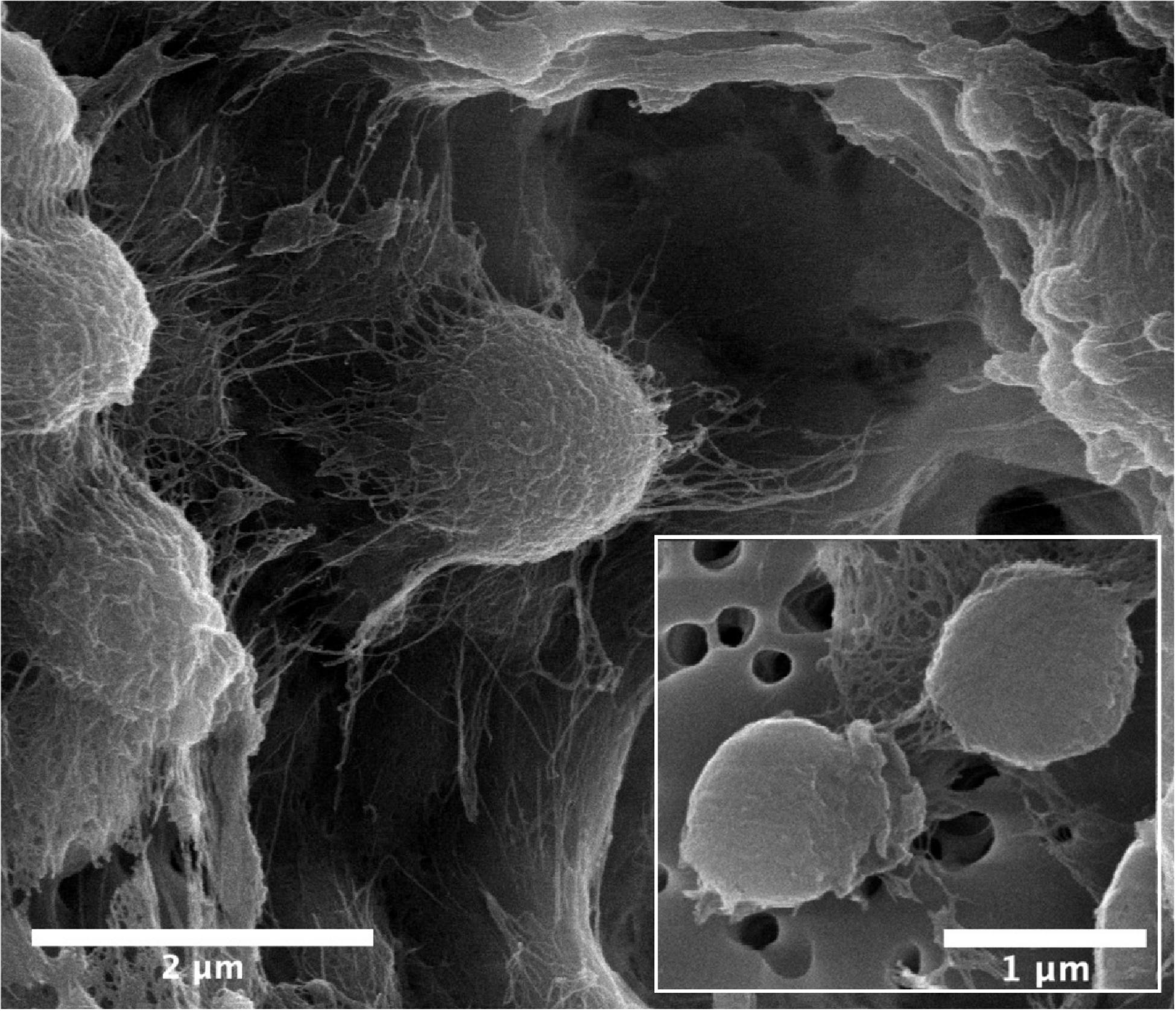
- SEM micrographs of Kineococcus rubinsiae

Scientific classification
- Domain: Bacteria
- Kingdom: Bacillati
- Phylum: Actinomycetota
- Class: Actinomycetes
- Order: Kineosporiales
- Family: Kineosporiaceae
- Genus: Kineococcus; Yokota et al. 1993

Type species
- Kineococcus aurantiacus Yokota et al. 1993

Species
- See text

= Kineococcus =

Genus of bacteria

Kineococcus is a genus of bacteria in the family Kineosporiaceae.

== Phylogeny ==
The currently accepted taxonomy is based on the List of Prokaryotic names with Standing in Nomenclature (LPSN) and National Center for Biotechnology Information (NCBI)

16S rRNA based LTP_08_2023

- Kineococcus
  - - K. glutinatus corrig. Nie et al. 2012
    - K. xinjiangensis Liu et al. 2009
  - - K. rubinsiae Mhatre et al. 2021
    - - K. siccus Molina-Menor et al. 2021
      - - - - K. gypseus Li et al. 2015
            - K. indalonis Molina-Menor et al. 2021
          - - K. aureolus Xu et al. 2017
            - K. terrestris corrig. Xu et al. 2017
        - - K. gynurae Duangmal et al. 2008
          - - - K. mangrovi Duangmal et al. 2016
              - K. rhizosphaerae Lee 2009
            - - K. vitellinus Molina-Menor et al. 2021
              - - K. endophyticus corrig. Bian et al. 2014
                - - K. aurantiacus Yokota et al. 1993
                  - K. radiotolerans Phillips et al. 2002

120 marker proteins based GTDB 08-RS214

- Kineococcus
  - K. xinjiangensis
  - - - K. rubinsiae
      - K. siccus
    - - K. indalonis
      - - K. vitellinus
        - - K. radiotolerans
          - - K. aurantiacus
            - K. rhizosphaerae
