= Benzaldehyde dehydrogenase (NADP+) =

benzaldehyde dehydrogenase (NADP+)

Identifiers
- EC no.: 1.2.1.7
- CAS no.: 9028-89-1

Databases
- IntEnz: IntEnz view
- BRENDA: BRENDA entry
- ExPASy: NiceZyme view
- KEGG: KEGG entry
- MetaCyc: metabolic pathway
- PRIAM: profile
- PDB structures: RCSB PDB PDBe PDBsum
- Gene Ontology: AmiGO / QuickGO
Search
- PMC: articles
- PubMed: articles
- NCBI: proteins

In enzymology, a benzaldehyde dehydrogenase (NADP+) (EC 1.2.1.7) is an enzyme that catalyzes the chemical reaction

benzaldehyde
+ NADP^{+}
H_{2}O
H^{+}
H_{2}O
H^{+}
benzoic acid
+ NADPH

The three substrates of this enzyme are benzaldehyde, oxidised nicotinamide adenine dinucleotide phosphate (NADP^{+}), and water. Its products are benzoic acid, reduced NADPH, and a proton.

This enzyme belongs to the family of oxidoreductases, specifically those acting on the aldehyde or oxo group of donor with NAD+ or NADP+ as acceptor. The systematic name of this enzyme class is benzaldehyde:NADP+ oxidoreductase. Other names in common use include NADP+-linked benzaldehyde dehydrogenase, and benzaldehyde dehydrogenase (NADP+). This enzyme participates in benzoate degradation via hydroxylation and toluene and xylene degradation.
