= Vallicoccus soli =

Scientific classification
- Domain: Bacteria
- Kingdom: Bacillati
- Phylum: Actinomycetota
- Class: Actinomycetia
- Order: Frankiales
- Family: Vallicoccaceae; Feng et al. 2021
- Genus: Vallicoccus; Feng et al. 2021
- Species: V. soli

Binomial name
- Vallicoccus soli Feng et al. 2021

Type strain
- CGMCC 1.13844; DSM 45377; KCTC 49228; YIM 75000

Species of bacteria

Vallicoccus soli is a species of bacteria from the phylum Actinomycetota.
