= PhagesDB =

Actinobacteriophage Database
- Founded: April 2010
- Location: Pittsburgh Bacteriophage Institute at the University of Pittsburgh
- Members: 20,366 (as of 3/15/2022)
- Key people: Dr. Graham Hatfull (HHMI Professor), Dan Russell (Webmaster), Debbie Jacobs-Sera (Phagehunting Program Coordinator), Dr. Welkin H. Pope (Research Assistant Professor), and Dr. Viknesh Sivanathan (HHMI Program Officer)
- Affiliations: SEA-PHAGES (Science Education Alliance-Phage Hunters Advancing Genomics and Evolutionary Science)
- Website: phagesdb.org

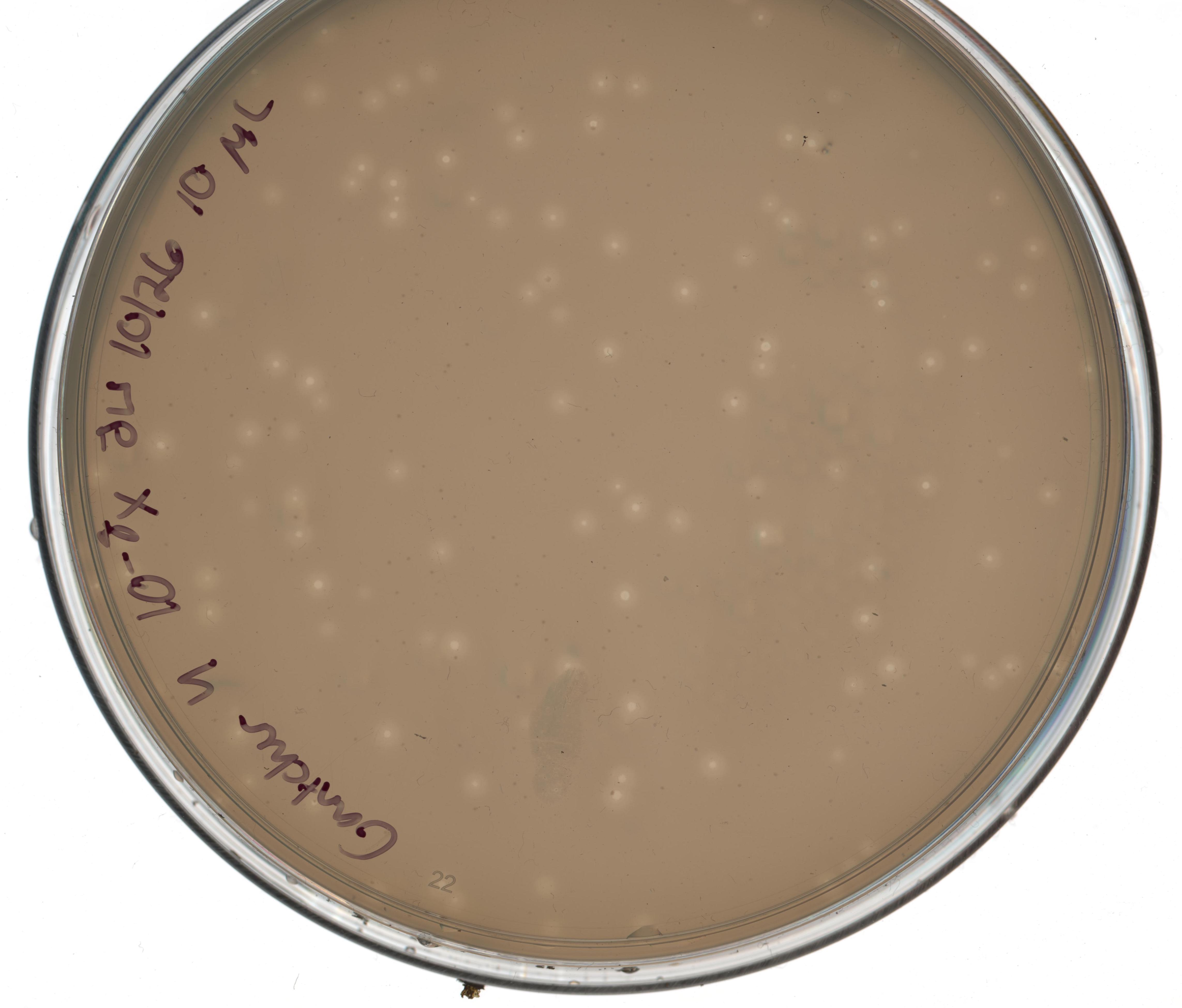
Plaque exhibiting bacterial lawn with clearings made by Artharobacter phage GantcherGoblin.

The Actinobacteriophage database, more commonly known as PhagesDB, is a bioinformatics website that collects and shares information related to the discovery, characterization, and genomics of viruses that typically infect Actinobacteria. At the start of 2026, the database contained information on more than 30,000 bacteriophages (phages), as well as over 5,000 fully sequenced phages.

== Design and features ==
PhagesDB has individual entries for each different virus in the database, along with a separate GeneMark page, as well as amino-acid information about phage genomes. The table below indicates the different types (by bacterial host genus) and numbers of phages sequenced:

Phage Types Sequenced	Number Sequenced
Actinoplanes	1
Arthrobacter	674
Brevibacterium	3
Corynebacterium	33
Curtobacterium	54
Gordonia	873
Microbacterium	780
Mycobacterium	2702
Propionibacterium	57
Rhodococcus	75
Rothia	1
Streptomyces	420
Tetrasphaera	1
Tsukamurella	2

== Access and rights to data ==
Information published in this database can be freely viewed by anyone, and an Application Programming Interface (API) is available. PhagesDB keeps some unpublished data, including newly performed genomic sequences.

== See also ==
- Bioinformatics
- Genomics
- Mycobacteria
- Bacteriophage
- DNA sequencing
- BLAST
