= Protocatechuate 4,5-dioxygenase =

Class of enzymes

Identifiers
- EC no.: 1.13.11.8
- CAS no.: 9029-56-5

Databases
- IntEnz: IntEnz view
- BRENDA: BRENDA entry
- ExPASy: NiceZyme view
- KEGG: KEGG entry
- MetaCyc: metabolic pathway
- PRIAM: profile
- PDB structures: RCSB PDB PDBe PDBsum
- Gene Ontology: AmiGO / QuickGO
Search
- PMC: articles
- PubMed: articles
- NCBI: proteins

Protocatechuate 4,5-dioxygenase (EC 1.13.11.8) is an enzyme that catalyzes the chemical reaction

protocatechuic acid
O_{2}
4-carboxy-2-hydroxy-cis,cis-muconate 6-semialdehyde

The two substrates of this enzyme are protocatechuic acid and oxygen. Its product is 4-carboxy-2-hydroxy-cis,cis-muconate 6-semialdehyde.

This enzyme belongs to the family of oxidoreductases, specifically those acting on single donors with O_{2} as oxidant and incorporation of two atoms of oxygen into the substrate (oxygenases). The oxygen incorporated need not be derived from O_{2}. The systematic name of this enzyme class is protocatechuate:oxygen 4,5-oxidoreductase (decyclizing). Other names in common use include protocatechuate 4,5-oxygenase, protocatechuic 4,5-dioxygenase, and protocatechuic 4,5-oxygenase. This enzyme participates in benzoate degradation via hydroxylation and 2,4-dichlorobenzoate degradation. It employs one cofactor, iron.

== Structural studies ==
As of late 2007, two structures have been solved for this class of enzymes, with PDB accession codes 1B4U and 1BOU.
