= Catenulispora =

Scientific classification
- Domain: Bacteria
- Kingdom: Bacillati
- Phylum: Actinomycetota
- Class: Actinomycetes
- Order: Catenulisporales
- Family: Catenulisporaceae; Busti et al. 2006
- Genus: Catenulispora; Busti et al. 2006

Type species
- Catenulispora acidiphila Busti et al. 2006

Species
- C. acidiphila; "C. cavernae"; C. fulva; C. graminis; C. pinisilvae; C. pinistramenti; C. rubra; C. subtropica; C. yoronensis

Genus of bacteria

Catenulispora is a Gram-positive, rod-shaped and aerobic genus of bacteria.

== Phylogeny ==
The currently accepted taxonomy is based on the List of Prokaryotic names with Standing in Nomenclature (LPSN) and National Center for Biotechnology Information (NCBI).

16S rRNA based LTP_10_2024

- Catenulispora
  - C. graminis Lee et al. 2012
  - - - C. subtropica Tamura et al. 2008
      - - C. fulva Lee and Whang 2016
        - C. yoronensis Tamura et al. 2008
    - - C. rubra Tamura et al. 2007
      - - C. acidiphila Busti et al. 2006
        - - C. pinisilvae Świecimska et al. 2021
          - C. pinistramenti Świecimska et al. 2021

120 marker proteins based GTDB 10-RS226

- Catenulispora
  - - C. subtropica
    - C. yoronensis
  - - - C. pinisilvae
      - C. pinistramenti
    - - C. acidiphila
      - C. rubra
