= Sporichthyaceae =

Scientific classification
- Domain: Bacteria
- Kingdom: Bacillati
- Phylum: Actinomycetota
- Class: Actinomycetes
- Order: Sporichthyales; Nouioui et al. 2018
- Family: Sporichthyaceae; Rainey et al. 1997

Genera
- Longivirga; Sporichthya

Family of bacteria

The Sporichthyaceae are the only family of the order Sporichthyales, which is a part of the phylum Actinomycetota.

== Phylogeny ==
The currently accepted taxonomy is based on the List of Prokaryotic names with Standing in Nomenclature (LPSN) and National Center for Biotechnology Information (NCBI).

16S rRNA based LTP_10_2024

- - - Sporichthyales
      - Sporichthyaceae
        Sporichthya Lechevalier, Lechevalier & Holbert 1968
  - - Longivirga Qu et al. 2018
    - - Nakamurellales
        Nakamurellaceae

120 marker proteins based GTDB 10-RS226

- Sporichthyales
  - Sporichthyaceae
    Sporichthya

== See also ==
- List of bacterial orders
- List of bacteria genera
