= Tsukamurella =

Scientific classification
- Domain: Bacteria
- Kingdom: Bacillati
- Phylum: Actinomycetota
- Class: Actinomycetes
- Order: Mycobacteriales
- Family: Tsukamurellaceae; Rainey et al. 1997
- Genus: Tsukamurella; Collins et al. 1988

Type species
- Tsukamurella paurometabola corrig. (Steinhaus 1941) Collins et al. 1988

Species
- T. asaccharolytica Teng et al. 2020; T. conjunctivitidis Teng et al. 2020; T. hominis Teng et al. 2018; T. hongkongensis Teng et al. 2016; T. inchonensis Yassin et al. 1995; T. ocularis Teng et al. 2018; T. paurometabola corrig. (Steinhaus 1941) Collins et al. 1988; T. pseudospumae Nam et al. 2004; T. pulmonis Yassin et al. 1996; T. serpentis Tang et al. 2016; T. sinensis Teng et al. 2016; T. soli Weon et al. 2010; T. spumae Nam et al. 2003; T. sputi Teng et al. 2020; T. strandjordii corrig. Kattar et al. 2002; T. tyrosinosolvens Yassin et al. 1997

Genus of bacteria

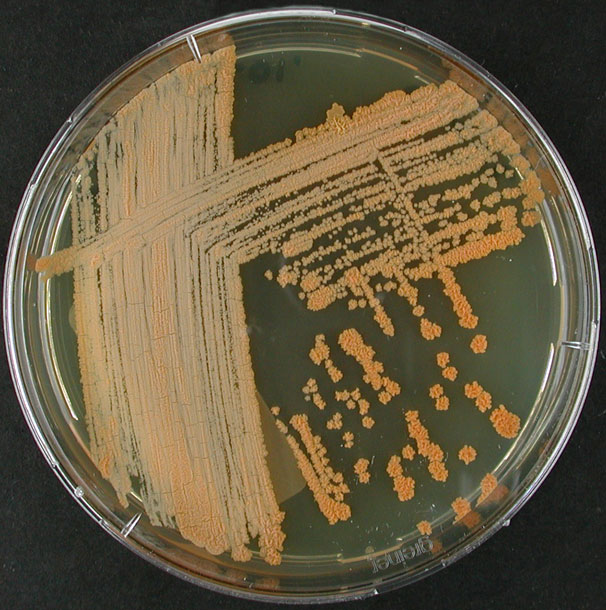
A Tsukamurella pseudospumae disk

Tsukamurella is a Gram-positive, non-spore-forming, rod-shaped and obligate aerobic bacterial genus from the family of Tsukamurellaceae. Most of the strains of Tsukamurella degrade starch. Some Tsukamurella species can cause infections in humans.
