= Acidothermus =

Scientific classification
- Domain: Bacteria
- Kingdom: Bacillati
- Phylum: Actinomycetota
- Class: Actinomycetes
- Order: Acidothermales; Rainey et al. 1997
- Family: Acidothermaceae; Mohagheghi et al. 1986
- Genus: Acidothermus; Mohagheghi et al. 1986
- Species: A. cellulolyticus

Binomial name
- Acidothermus cellulolyticus Mohagheghi et al. 1986

Genus of bacteria

Acidothermus cellulolyticus is a species of gram-variable bacteria. It is the only member of the genus Acidothermus and the family Acidothermaceae.

== History ==
A. cellulolyticus was first isolated from acidic hot springs at Yellowstone National Park in 1987.

== Etymology ==
The name Acidothermus derives from:
Latin adjective acidus, sour, acid; Greek adjective thermos (θερμός), hot; Neo-Latin masculine gender noun Acidothermus, acid and hot (loving).

The specific epithet cellulolyticus derives from Neo-Latin noun cellulosum, cellulose; Neo-Latin masculine gender adjective lyticus (from Greek masculine gender adjective lutikos (λυτικός)), able to loose, able to dissolve; Neo-Latin masculine gender adjective cellulolyticus, cellulose-dissolving.)

== See also ==
- List of bacterial orders
- List of bacteria genera
