= Aquipuribacter =

Scientific classification
- Domain: Bacteria
- Kingdom: Bacillati
- Phylum: Actinomycetota
- Class: Actinomycetes
- Order: Micrococcales
- Family: Intrasporangiaceae
- Genus: Aquipuribacter; Tóth et al. 2012

Type species
- Aquipuribacter hungaricus Tóth et al. 2012

Species
- A. hungaricus Tóth et al. 2012; A. nitratireducens Srinivas et al. 2015

Genus of bacteria

Aquipuribacter is a bacterial genus from the family Intrasporangiaceae.
