= Jiangellaceae =

Scientific classification
- Domain: Bacteria
- Kingdom: Bacillati
- Phylum: Actinomycetota
- Class: Actinomycetes
- Order: Jiangellales; Tang et al. 2015
- Family: Jiangellaceae; Tang et al. 2011

Genera
- Haloactinopolyspora; Jiangella; Phytoactinopolyspora

Synonyms
- Jiangellineae Tang et al. 2011

Family of bacteria

The Jiangellaceae are the only family of the order Jiangellales, which is a part of the phylum Actinomycetota.

== Phylogeny ==
The currently accepted taxonomy is based on the List of Prokaryotic names with Standing in Nomenclature (LPSN) and National Center for Biotechnology Information (NCBI)

whole-genome sequences

- - - Haloactinopolyspora
    - Jiangella

16S rRNA based LTP_08_2023 and 120 marker proteins based GTDB 10-RS226

- - Phytoactinopolyspora Li et al. 2015
  - - Haloactinopolyspora Tang et al. 2011
    - Jiangella Song et al. 2005

== See also ==
- List of bacterial orders
- List of bacteria genera
