= Jatrophihabitans =

Scientific classification
- Domain: Bacteria
- Kingdom: Bacillati
- Phylum: Actinomycetota
- Class: Actinomycetes
- Order: Jatrophihabitantales; Salam et al. 2020
- Family: Jatrophihabitantaceae; Nouioui et al. 2018
- Genus: Jatrophihabitans; Madhaiyan et al. 2013

Type species
- Jatrophihabitans endophyticus Madhaiyan et al. 2013

Species
- J. cynanchi; J. endophyticus; J. fulvus; J. huperziae; J. lederbergiae; J. soli; J. telluris

Genus of bacteria

Jatrophihabitans is a genus of Actinomycetota.

== Phylogeny ==
The currently accepted taxonomy is based on the List of Prokaryotic names with Standing in Nomenclature (LPSN) and National Center for Biotechnology Information (NCBI).

16S rRNA based LTP_10_2024

- Jatrophihabitans
  - J. telluris Lee et al. 2018
  - - - J. endophyticus Madhaiyan et al. 2013
      - J. fulvus Jin et al. 2015
    - - J. huperziae Gong et al. 2016
      - J. soli Kim et al. 2015

120 marker proteins based GTDB 10-RS226

- Jatrophihabitans
  - J. telluris
  - - J. cynanchi Suh et al. 2024
    - J. endophyticus

== See also ==
- List of bacterial orders
- List of bacteria genera
