= Nakamurella =

Scientific classification
- Domain: Bacteria
- Kingdom: Bacillati
- Phylum: Actinomycetota
- Class: Actinomycetes
- Order: Nakamurellales; Sen et al. 2014
- Family: Nakamurellaceae; Tao et al. 2004
- Genus: Nakamurella; Tao et al. 2004

Species
- See text

Synonyms
- Nakamurellaceae: Microsphaeraceae Rainey et al. 1997; Nakamurella: Humicoccus Yoon et al. 2007; Microsphaera Yoshimi, Hiraishi & Nakamura 1996 non Leveille 1851 non Redtenbacher 1845 non Cohn 1872; Saxeibacter Lee et al. 2008

Family of bacteria

The Nakamurella is a genus of bacteria.

== Phylogeny ==
The currently accepted taxonomy is based on the List of Prokaryotic names with Standing in Nomenclature (LPSN) and National Center for Biotechnology Information (NCBI).

16S rRNA based LTP_10_2024

- Nakamurella
  - - N. alba corrig. Jiang et al. 2023
    - N. endophytica Tuo et al. 2016
  - - - N. intestinalis Kim et al. 2017
      - - N. antarctica Da et al. 2019
        - N. deserti Liu et al. 2019
    - - N. multipartita (Yoshimi et al. 1996) Tao et al. 2004
      - - N. silvestris França et al. 2016
        - - N. flava Yan et al. 2020
          - - N. panacisegetis Kim et al. 2012
            - - N. leprariae An et al. 2022
              - - N. flavida (Yoon et al. 2007) Kim et al. 2012
                - - N. aerolata Chaudhary et al. 2021
                  - N. lactea (Lee et al. 2008) Kim et al. 2012

120 marker proteins based GTDB 10-RS226

- Nakamurella
  - - N. silvestris
    - - N. antarctica
      - N. deserti
  - - - N. aerolata
      - N. lactea
    - - - N. panacisegetis
        - - N. alba
          - N. endophytica
      - - - N. flavida
          - N. leprariae
        - - N. flava
          - N. multipartita

== See also ==
- List of bacterial orders
- List of bacteria genera
