= Frankiales =

Scientific classification
- Domain: Bacteria
- Kingdom: Bacillati
- Phylum: Actinomycetota
- Class: Actinomycetes
- Order: Frankiales; Sen et al. 2014

Type genus
- Frankia Brunchorst 1886 (Approved Lists 1980)

Families
- Frankiaceae; Vallicoccaceae

Synonyms
- Frankiineae corrig. Stackebrandt, Rainey & Ward-Rainey 1997

Order of bacteria

Frankia

The Frankiales are an order of bacteria, containing three monotypic families, each with only one genus. The order consists of slow-growing aerobic to microaerophilic, soil-inhabiting mesophilic organisms that are in symbiosis with pioneer plants.
