= Benzoate degradation via hydroxylation =

Chemical reaction

Benzoate degradation via hydroxylation is an enzyme-catalyzed, bacterial chemical reaction. Benzoate is degraded aerobically and anaerobically. Aerobic degradation forms catechol. Anaerobic degradation forms cyclohex-1,5-diene-1-carbonylCoA. A hybrid degradation forms Acetyl-CoA and Succinyl-CoA.

== Potential microbes ==
Scientific name	NBRC No.
Acinetobacter radioresistens	102413
Acinetobacter sp.	100985
Corynebacterium callunae	15359
Corynebacterium efficiens	100395
Corynebacterium glutamicum	12153
Corynebacterium glutamicum	12168
Cupriavidus metallidurans	102507
Geodermatophilus obscurus	13315
Gordonia aichiensis	108223
Gordonia alkanivorans	16433
Gordonia bronchialis	16047
Gordonia namibiensis	108229
Gordonia polyisoprenivorans	16320
Gordonia rhizosphera	16068
Gordonia rubripertincta	101908
Gordonia sputi	100414
Gordonia terrae	100016
Marinomonas mediterranea	103028
Pseudomonas putida	100650
Rhodococcus opacus	108011
Saccharomonospora cyanea	14841
Saccharopolyspora erythraea	13426
Streptomyces ghanaensis	15414
