= Cryptosporangiaceae =

Scientific classification
- Domain: Bacteria
- Kingdom: Bacillati
- Phylum: Actinomycetota
- Class: Actinomycetes
- Order: Cryptosporangiales; Nouioui et al. 2018
- Family: Cryptosporangiaceae; Zhi et al. 2009

Type genus
- Cryptosporangium Tamura et al. 1998

Genera
- Cryptosporangium; Fodinicola

Synonyms
- "Fodinicolaceae" Pallen, Rodriguez-R & Alikhan 2022

Family of bacteria

The Cryptosporangiaceae are the only family of the order Cryptosporangiales, which is a part of the phylum Actinomycetota.

== Phylogeny ==
The currently accepted taxonomy is based on the List of Prokaryotic names with Standing in Nomenclature (LPSN) and National Center for Biotechnology Information (NCBI).

16S rRNA based LTP_10_2024

- Cryptosporangiaceae
  - Fodinicola
  - Cryptosporangium

120 marker proteins based GTDB 10-RS226

- - - Cryptosporangiaceae
      Cryptosporangium Tamura et al. 1998
  - - - "Fodinicolaceae"
        Fodinicola Carlsohn et al. 2008
    - Micromonosporaceae
