= Catenulisporales =

Scientific classification
- Domain: Bacteria
- Kingdom: Bacillati
- Phylum: Actinomycetota
- Class: Actinomycetes
- Order: Catenulisporales; Donadio et al. 2015

Type genus
- Catenulispora Busti et al. 2006

Families
- Actinospicaceae; Catenulisporaceae

Synonyms
- Catenulisporineae Cavaletti et al. 2006

Order of bacteria

Catenulisporales is an order of bacteria.

== Phylogeny ==
The currently accepted taxonomy is based on the List of Prokaryotic names with Standing in Nomenclature (LPSN) and National Center for Biotechnology Information (NCBI).

16S rRNA based LTP_10_2024

- Catenulisporales
  - Actinospicaceae
    Actinospica [incl. Actinocrinis]
  - Catenulisporaceae
    Catenulispora

120 marker proteins based GTDB 10-RS226

- Catenulisporaceae
  - - Actinocrinis Kim et al. 2017
    - Actinospica Cavaletti et al. 2006
  - Catenulispora Busti et al. 2006

== See also ==
- List of bacterial orders
- List of bacteria genera
