= Kineosporiaceae =

Scientific classification
- Domain: Bacteria
- Kingdom: Bacillati
- Phylum: Actinomycetota
- Class: Actinomycetes
- Order: Kineosporiales; Kämpfer 2015
- Family: Kineosporiaceae; Zhi et al. 2009

Type genus
- Kineosporia Pagani and Parenti 1978 (Approved Lists 1980)

Genera
- Angustibacter; Aquipuribacter; Kineococcus; Kineosporia; Pseudokineococcus; Quadrisphaera; "Spongisporangium"; Thalassiella

Synonyms
- Aquipuribacteraceae Salam et al. 2020; Quadrisphaeraceae Chuvochina et al. 2024

Family of bacteria

The Kineosporiaceae is a family of Gram positive bacteria.

== Phylogeny ==
The currently accepted taxonomy is based on the List of Prokaryotic names with Standing in Nomenclature (LPSN) and National Center for Biotechnology Information (NCBI).

whole-genome analysis (Note: Angustibacter, Pseudokineococcus, and Thalassiella are not included in this phylogenetic tree.)

- Kineosporiales Kineosporiaceae
  - Kineosporia
  - - Quadrisphaera
    - Kineococcus

16S rRNA based LTP_10_2024

- Kineosporiales Kineosporiaceae
  - - Quadrisphaera Maszenan et al. 2005
    - - Aquipuribacter Tóth et al. 2012
      - Pseudokineococcus Jurado et al. 2011
  - - Angustibacter speluncae
    - - Thalassiella Lee et al. 2017
      - - Angustibacter Tamura et al. 2010
        - - Kineosporia Pagani & Parenti 1978
          - Kineococcus Yokota et al. 1993

120 marker proteins based GTDB 09-RS220

- - - "Polyseptineae"
      - - "Angustibacteraceae"
          Angustibacter
      - Dermatophilaceae
  - - - Kineosporiineae
        - - Quadrisphaeraceae
            - Quadrisphaera
            - Pseudokineococcus
        - - Kineosporiaceae
            Kineosporia
          - "Kineococcaceae"
            Kineococcus
    - other

== See also ==
- List of bacterial orders
- List of bacteria genera
