= Gordoniaceae =

Scientific classification
- Domain: Bacteria
- Kingdom: Bacillati
- Phylum: Actinomycetota
- Class: Actinomycetes
- Order: Mycobacteriales
- Family: Gordoniaceae; Rainey et al. 1997

Type genus
- Gordonia corrig. (ex Tsukamura 1971) Stackebrandt et al. 1989

Genera
- Gordonia; Jongsikchunia; Williamsia

Family of bacteria

The Gordoniaceae are a family of bacteria in the order of Actinomycetales.

== Phylogeny ==
The currently accepted taxonomy is based on the List of Prokaryotic names with Standing in Nomenclature (LPSN) and National Center for Biotechnology Information (NCBI).

16S rRNA based LTP_10_2024

- Gordoniaceae
  - Williamsia sterculiae
  - - Williamsia
    - - Jongsikchunia
      - Gordonia

120 marker proteins based GTDB 10-RS226

- Gordoniaceae
  - - Jongsikchunia Nouioui et al. 2018
    - Williamsia Kämpfer et al. 1999
  - - Williamsia_A
    - - - Gordonia jinhuaensis
        - Williamsia sterculiae
      - Gordonia corrig. (ex Tsukamura 1971) Stackebrandt et al. 1989

== See also ==
- List of bacterial orders
- List of bacteria genera
