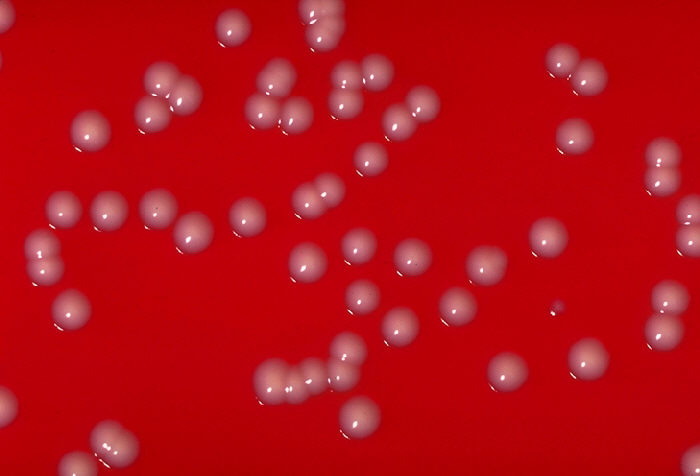
- Corynebacterium ulcerans colonies on a blood agar plate

Scientific classification
- Domain: Bacteria
- Kingdom: Bacillati
- Phylum: Actinomycetota
- Class: Actinomycetes
- Order: Mycobacteriales; Janke 1924 (Approved Lists 1980)

Type genus
- Mycobacterium Lehmann and Neumann 1896 (Approved Lists 1980)

Families
- Corynebacteriaceae; Dietziaceae; Gordoniaceae; Hoyosellaceae; Lawsonellaceae; Mycobacteriaceae; Nocardiaceae; Segniliparaceae; Tomitellaceae; Tsukamurellaceae

Synonyms
- Actinopolysporineae Zhi, Li & Stackebrandt 2009; Actinopolysporales Goodfellow & Trujillo 2015; Corynebacteriineae corrig. Stackebrandt et al. 1997; Corynebacteriales Goodfellow and Jones 2015; "Mycobacteriineae" Val-Calvo & Vazquez-Boland 2023; Pseudonocardiineae corrig. Stackebrandt et al. 1997; Pseudonocardiales Labeda & Goodfellow 2015

= Mycobacteriales =

Order of bacteria

The Mycobacteriales are an order of bacteria. The current description is genome-based, per Gupta 2019 emendation. Most members produce mycolic acids.

== Phylogeny ==
The currently accepted taxonomy is based on the List of Prokaryotic names with Standing in Nomenclature (LPSN). and National Center for Biotechnology Information (NCBI).

Whole-genome based phylogeny

- - - - Cryptosporangiales
        Cryptosporangiaceae
    - - Glycomycetales
        Glycomycetaceae (incl. ?Phytomonosporaceae)
      - Micromonosporales
        - Actinocatenisporaceae
        - Micromonosporaceae (incl. Actinoplanetaceae)
  - - - Jatrophihabitantales
        Jatrophihabitantaceae
      - Geodermatophilales
        - Antricoccaceae
        - Geodermatophilaceae
    - - - Nakamurellales
          Nakamurellaceae
      - - Pseudonocardiales
          Pseudonocardiaceae [incl. Actinopolysporaceae]
        - Mycobacteriales
          - - Lawsonellaceae
            - - Dietziaceae
              - Corynebacteriaceae
          - - - Tsukamurellaceae
              - Gordoniaceae
            - - - - Hoyosellaceae
                  - - Tomitellaceae
                    - Rhodococcus
                - Nocardiaceae
              - - Segniliparaceae
                - Mycobacteriaceae

16S rRNA based LTP_10_2024

- - - - Cryptosporangiales
        - Cryptosporangiaceae
        - "Fodinicolaceae"
    - - Sporichthyales
      - - Nakamurellales
          Nakamurellaceae
  - - Jatrophihabitantales
      Jatrophihabitantaceae
    - Geodermatophilales
      - Antricoccaceae
      - Geodermatophilaceae

- Frankiales
  Frankiaceae

- - - - Actinopolysporales
        Actinopolysporaceae
    - Streptosporangiales
  - - - Micromonosporales
        - Actinocatenisporaceae
        - - - Phytomonosporaceae
            - Glycomycetaceae
          - Micromonosporaceae (incl. Actinoplanetaceae)
    - - - Jiangellales
          Jiangellaceae
      - - Actinosynnemataceae
        - - - Pseudonocardiales
              Pseudonocardiaceae
          - - Mycobacteriales
              - Rhodococcus~1
              - - Segniliparaceae
                - - Nocardiaceae
                  - - Gordoniaceae
                    - - Tomitellaceae
                      - - - Tsukamurellaceae
                          - - Dietziaceae
                            - - Lawsonellaceae
                              - Corynebacteriaceae
                        - - Hoyosellaceae
                          - Mycobacteriaceae

120 marker proteins based GTDB 10-RS226

- Mycobacteriales
  - - Frankineae
      Frankiaceae
  - - Micromonosporineae
      - Cryptosporangiaceae
      - - "Fodinicolaceae"
        - Micromonosporaceae (incl. Actinocatenisporaceae; Actinoplanetaceae; Glycomycetaceae; Phytomonosporaceae)
    - Corynebacteriineae
      - Geodermatophilaceae
      - - Jatrophihabitantaceae
        - - Antricoccaceae
          - - Nakamurellaceae
            - - Pseudonocardiaceae (incl. Actinopolysporaceae; Actinosynnemataceae)
              - Mycobacteriaceae (incl. Corynebacteriaceae; Dietziaceae; Gordoniaceae; Hoyosellaceae; Lawsonellaceae; Nocardiaceae; Segniliparaceae; Tomitellaceae; Tsukamurellaceae)

== Terminology ==
Mycolata has been used as a non-taxonomic term for mycolic acid-containing Actinobacteria. Mycobacteriales includes all such species, but it also includes some without mycolic acid, making these two terms imperfect, paraphyletic, aliases.

== See also ==
- List of bacterial orders
- List of bacteria genera
