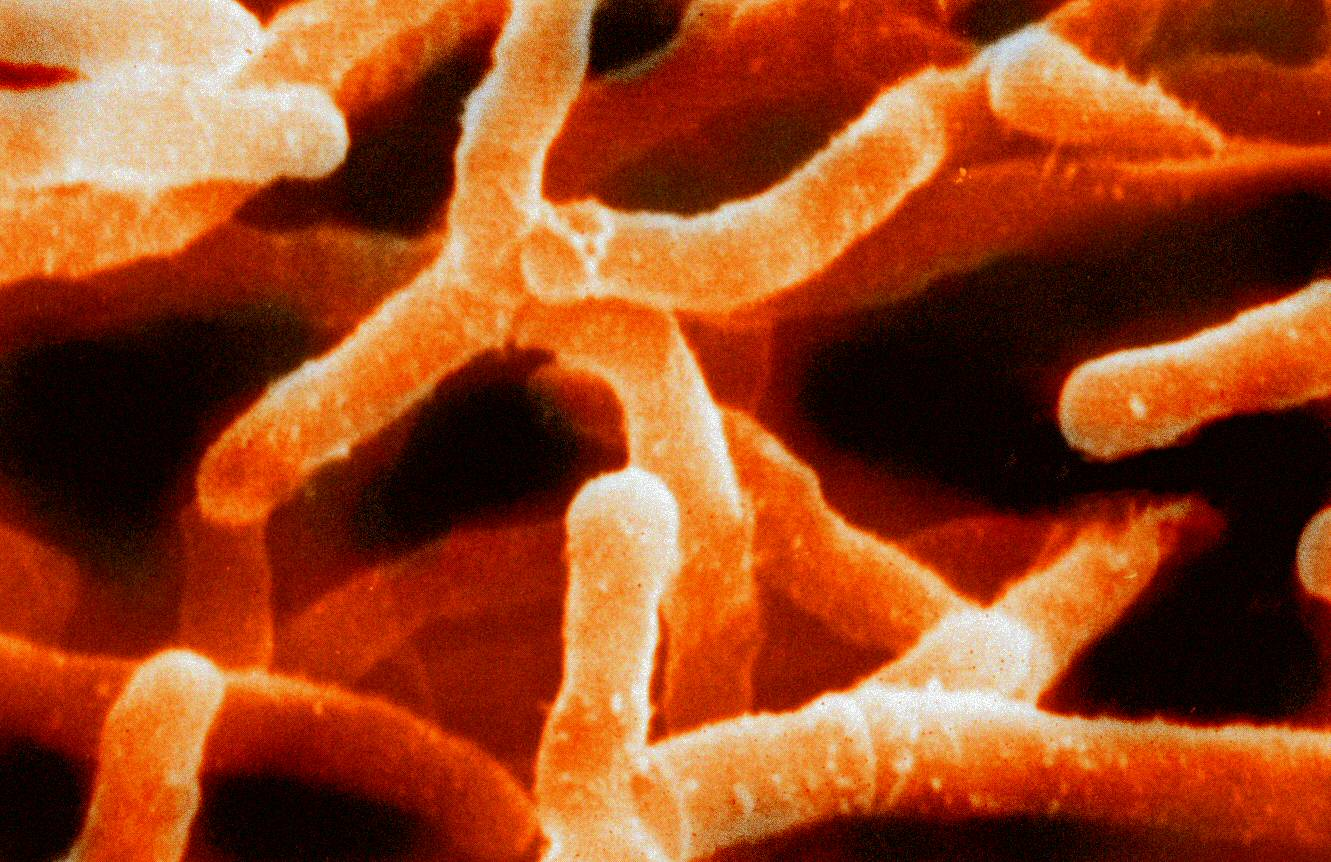
- Scanning electron micrograph of Actinomyces israelii.

Scientific classification
- Domain: Bacteria
- Kingdom: Bacillati
- Phylum: Actinomycetota
- Class: Actinomycetes; Krassilnikov 1949 (Approved Lists 1980)

Orders
- See text

Synonyms
- Actinobacteria Stackebrandt, Rainey & Ward-Rainey 1997; Actinobacteridae Stackebrandt, Rainey & Ward-Rainey 1997; Actinomycetia Salam et al. 2020; Arabobacteria Cavalier-Smith 2002; Arthrobacteria Cavalier-Smith 2002; Mycobacteria Pribram 1929; Streptomycetes Cavalier-Smith 2002

= Actinomycetes =

Class of bacteria

Actinomycetes is a class of bacteria in the phylum Actinomycetota.

== Taxonomy ==
The currently accepted taxonomy is based on the List of Prokaryotic names with Standing in Nomenclature (LPSN) and National Center for Biotechnology Information (NCBI).

- Acidothermales Sen et al. 2014
- Actinomycetales Buchanan 1917 (Approved Lists 1980)
- ?Bifidobacteriales Stackebrandt et al. 1997
- Catenulisporales Donadio et al. 2015
- Cryptosporangiales Nouioui et al. 2018
- Frankiales Sen et al. 2014
- Geodermatophilales Sen et al. 2014
- ?Glycomycetales Labeda 2015
- Jatrophihabitantales Salam et al. 2020
- Jiangellales Tang et al. 2015
- Kineosporiales Kämpfer 2015
- ?Micrococcales Prévot 1940 (Approved Lists 1980)
- Micromonosporales Genilloud 2015
- Motilibacterales Salam et al. 2020
- Mycobacteriales Janke 1924 (Approved Lists 1980)
- Nakamurellales Sen et al. 2014
- Propionibacteriales (Rainey et al. 1997) Patrick and McDowell 2015
- Pseudonocardiales Labeda and Goodfellow 2015
- Sporichthyales Nouioui et al. 2018
- Streptomycetales Cavalier-Smith 2002
- Streptosporangiales Goodfellow 2015

== Phylogeny ==
Whole-genome based phylogeny

- - - - Frankiales
      - - - Jiangellales
          - Propionibacteriales
        - - Streptosporangiales
          - - - Acidothermales
              - Sporichthyales
            - - Catenulisporales
              - Streptomycetales (incl. Kitasatosporales)
    - - - Cryptosporangiales
        - - Glycomycetales (incl. ?Phytomonosporales)
          - Micromonosporales (incl. Actinocatenisporales, Actinoplanetales)
      - - - Jatrophihabitantales
          - Geodermatophilales (incl. Antricoccales)
        - - Nakamurellales
          - - Mycobacteriales (incl. Corynebacteriales)
            - Pseudonocardiales (incl. Actinopolysporales)
  - - Microbacteriales
    - - Kineosporiales (incl. Dermatophilales)
      - - - - Bifidobacteriales
            - Actinomycetales
          - Cellulomonadales (incl. Beutenbergiales; Bogoriellales; Cellulomonadales; Demequinales; Ruaniales)
        - Micrococcales (incl. Dermabacterales; Brevibacteriales)

16S rRNA based LTP_10_2024

- Actinomycetia
  - Bifidobacteriales
  - - other
    - - - Propionibacteriales
        - - - Actinopolysporales
            - Streptosporangiales
          - - Micromonosporales (incl. Actinocatenisporales, Actinoplanetales, Glycomycetales, Phytomonosporales)
            - - Jiangellales
              - - Pseudonocardiaceae~
                - - Pseudonocardiales
                  - Mycobacteriales (incl. Corynebacteriales)
      - - - - - Cryptosporangiales
              - - Sporichthyales
                - Nakamurellales
            - - Jatrophihabitantales
              - Geodermatophilales (incl. Antricoccales)
          - - - - Carbonactinosporaceae
                - Acidothermales
              - Frankiales
            - - Catenulisporales
              - - Motilibacterales
                - Streptomycetales (incl. Kitasatosporales)
        - - Kineosporiales (incl. Aquipuribacterales)
          - - Microbacteriales
            - - Cellulomonadales (incl. Demequinales)
              - - Actinomycetales (incl. Beutenbergiales; Bogoriellales; Ruaniales)
                - - Dermatophilales (incl. Dermabacterales)
                  - Micrococcales (incl. Brevibacteriales)

120 marker proteins based GTDB 10-RS226

- Actinomycetia
  - - Actinomycetales
      - "Polyseptineae" (incl. Dermatophilales)
      - - Kineosporineae (incl. Kineosporiales, Aquipuribacterales)
        - - Quadrisphaeraceae
          - - Actinomycetineae (incl. Beutenbergiales; Bogoriellales; Cellulomonadales; Demequinales; Ruaniales)
            - Micrococcineae (incl. Bifidobacteriales; Brevibacteriales; Dermabacterales; Microbacteriales; Micrococcales)
  - - - Jiangellales
      - Propionibacteriales
    - - Motilibacterales
      - - "Nanopelagicales"
        - - - Sporichthyales
            - Streptomycetales (incl. Carbonactinosporaceae; Catenulisporales, Kitasatosporales)
          - - - Acidothermales
              - Streptosporangiales
            - - Mycobacteriales
                - Frankineae (incl. Frankiales)
                - - Unnamed (incl. Antricoccales; Geodermatophilales)
                  - - Micromonosporineae (incl. Actinocatenisporales; Actinoplanetales; Cryptosporangiales; Glycomycetales; Micromonosporales; Phytomonosporales)
                    - Corynebacterineae (incl. Actinopolysporales; Antricoccales; Corynebacteriales; Geodermatophilales; Jatrophihabitantales; Nakamurellales; Pseudonocardiales)

== See also ==
- List of bacteria genera
- List of bacterial orders
