= Rifampicin/isoniazid/pyrazinamide =

Combination drug

Combination of
- Rifampicin: Rifamycin antibiotic
- Isoniazid: Anti-tuberculosis medication
- Pyrazinamide: Anti-tuberculosis medication

Clinical data
- Trade names: Rifater, Trifazid, others
- AHFS/Drugs.com: FDA Professional Drug Information
- License data: US DailyMed: Rifampin_isoniazid_and_pyrazinamide
- Routes of administration: By mouth
- ATC code: J04AM05 (WHO)

Legal status
- Legal status: US: ℞-only; In general: ℞ (Prescription only)

Identifiers
- CAS Number: 161935-14-4
- PubChem CID: 6474062
- ChemSpider: none
- KEGG: D10210

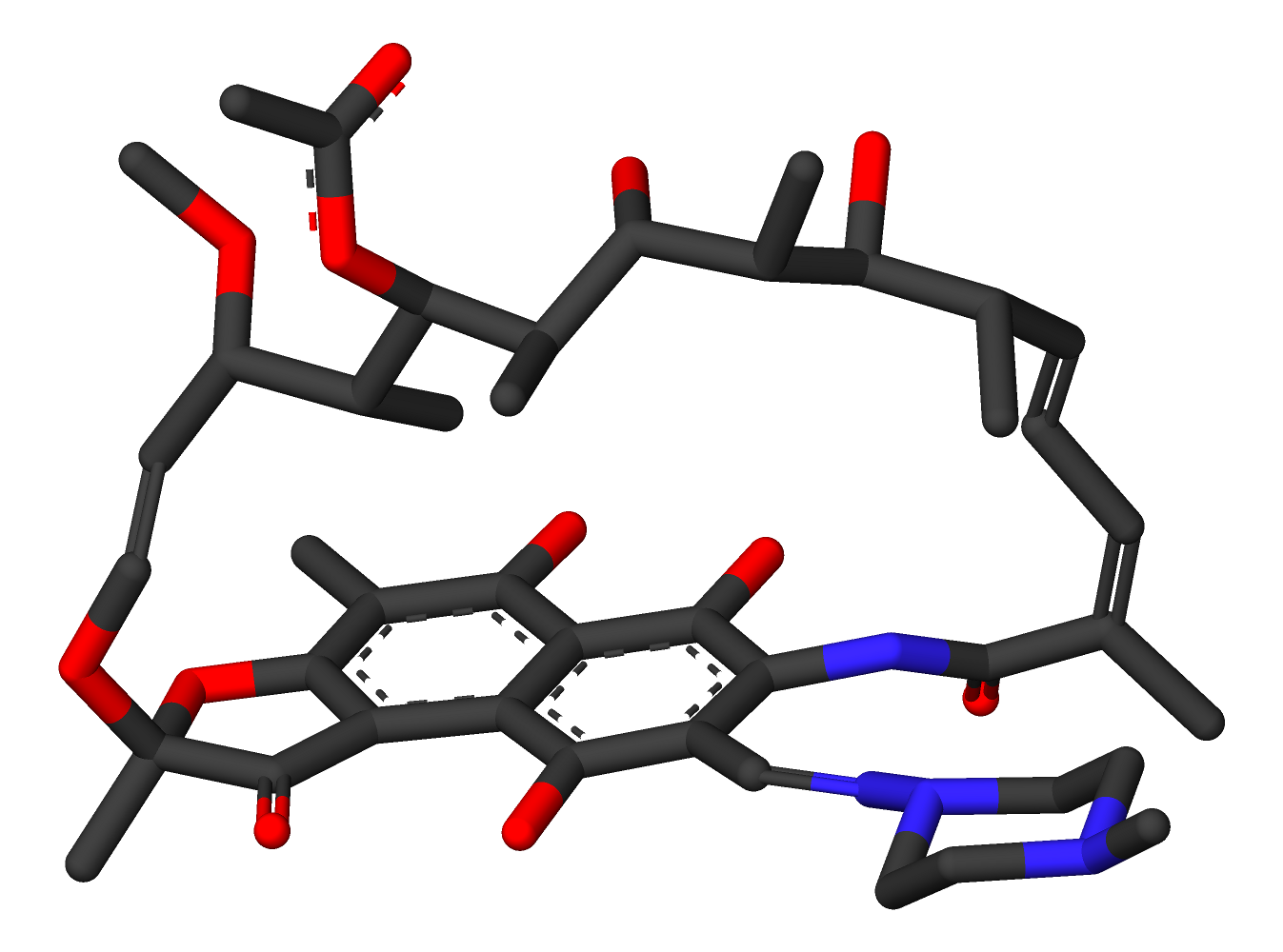
3D structure Rifampicin/isoniazid/pyrazinamide

Rifampicin/isoniazid/pyrazinamide, also known as rifampin/isoniazid/pyrazinamide, and sold under the trade name Rifater, is a medication used to treat tuberculosis. It is a fixed dose combination of rifampicin, isoniazid, and pyrazinamide. It is used either by itself or along with other antituberculosis medication. It is taken by mouth.

Side effects are those of the underlying medications. These may include poor coordination, loss of appetite, nausea, joint pain, feeling tired, and numbness. Severe side effects include liver problems. Use in those under the age of 15 may not be appropriate. It is unclear if use in pregnancy is safe for the baby.

Rifampicin/isoniazid/pyrazinamide was approved for medical use in the United States in 1994. It is on the World Health Organization's List of Essential Medicines.

== Medical uses ==
The hope of a fixed-dose combination pill is to increase the likelihood that people will take all of three medications. Also, if people forget to take one or two of their drugs, they might not then develop resistance to the remaining drugs.

== Society and culture ==
It is manufactured by Aventis.

== See also ==
- Tuberculosis treatment
- Rifampicin + isoniazid + ethambutol
