= Ethambutol/isoniazid =

Combination medication for tuberculosis

Combination of
- Ethambutol: Anti-tuberculosis medication
- Isoniazid: Anti-tuberculosis medication

Clinical data
- ATC code: J04AM03 (WHO)

Identifiers
- CAS Number: 39346-16-2

Ethambutol/isoniazid is a fixed-dose combination medication used to treat tuberculosis. It is a fixed dose combination of ethambutol and isoniazid. It is used along with other antituberculosis medication. It is taken by mouth.

Side effects are those of the underlying medications. More common side effects include poor coordination, numbness, and liver problems. Liver problems may be severe and are more likely in people over the age of 50. Use is not recommended in children. It is unclear if use in pregnancy is safe for the baby.

It was removed from the World Health Organization's List of Essential Medicines in 2019. The combination product is not available in Canada or in the United States.
