= Ethambutol/isoniazid/rifampicin =

Combination medication

Combination of
- ethambutol: anti-tuberculosis medication
- isoniazid: anti-tuberculosis medication
- rifampicin: anti-tuberculosis medication

Clinical data
- ATC code: J04AM07 (WHO)

Identifiers
- CAS Number: 402507-77-1
- ChemSpider: none

Ethambutol/isoniazid/rifampicin, also known as ethambutol/isoniazid/rifampin, is a fixed-dose combination medication used to treat tuberculosis. It contains ethambutol, isoniazid, and rifampicin. It is used either alone or with other anti-tuberculosis medication. It is taken by mouth. Side effects are those of the underlying medications. Use may not be suitable in children.

It is on the World Health Organization's List of Essential Medicines.

== See also ==
- Ethambutol/isoniazid/pyrazinamide/rifampicin
