= Ethambutol/isoniazid/pyrazinamide/rifampicin =

Combination medication used for tuberculosis

Combination of
- Ethambutol: Anti-tuberculosis medication
- Isoniazid: Anti-tuberculosis medication
- Pyrazinamide: Anti-tuberculosis medication
- Rifampicin: Anti-tuberculosis medication

Clinical data
- Trade names: Voractiv, Rimstar, others
- Routes of administration: By mouth
- ATC code: J04AM06 (WHO)

Identifiers
- CAS Number: 357397-87-6
- ChemSpider: none

Ethambutol/isoniazid/pyrazinamide/rifampicin, also known as ethambutol/isoniazid/pyrazinamide/rifampin, is a medication used for tuberculosis. It is a fixed dose combination of ethambutol, isoniazid, pyrazinamide, and rifampicin. It is used either alone or with other antituberculosis medication. It is taken by mouth.

Side effects are those of the underlying medications. Pyridoxine may be used to decrease the risk of numbness. It is not recommended in people with liver problems or severe kidney problems. Use may not be suitable in children. It is unclear if use during pregnancy is safe.

It is on the World Health Organization's List of Essential Medicines. It is sold under the brand names Voractiv and Rimstar in the UK.
