= Cotrifazid =

Treatment and prophylaxis for malaria

Combination of
- Rifampicin: Anti-tuberculosis medication
- Isoniazid: Anti-tuberculosis medication
- Sulfamethoxazole: Sulfonamide
- Trimethoprim: Antibiotic

Clinical data
- Pregnancy category: AU: C
- Routes of administration: oral

Legal status
- Legal status: AU: S4 (Prescription only); UK: POM (Prescription only); US: ℞-only

Cotrifazid is a treatment and prophylaxis for malaria consisting of a multiple complex combination of rifampicin, isoniazid, sulfamethoxazole, and trimethoprim.
