= C25H43N13O10 =

The molecular formula C_{25}H_{43}N_{13}O_{10} (molar mass: 685.69 g/mol, exact mass: 685.3256 u) may refer to:

- Enviomycin
- Viomycin
