= C10H14N4O2 =

Molecular formula

The molecular formulas C_{10}H_{14}N_{4}O_{2} (molar mass : 222.3 g/mol) may refer to:

- IBMX, a non-specific inhibitor of phosphodiesterases
- Morinamide
