= Arabinosyltransferase =

Class of enzymes

Identifiers
- Symbol: Arabinose_trans
- Pfam: PF04602
- Pfam clan: CL0111
- InterPro: IPR007680
- CAZy: GT53
Available protein structures:
- PDB: IPR007680 PF04602 (ECOD; PDBsum)
- AlphaFold: IPR007680; PF04602

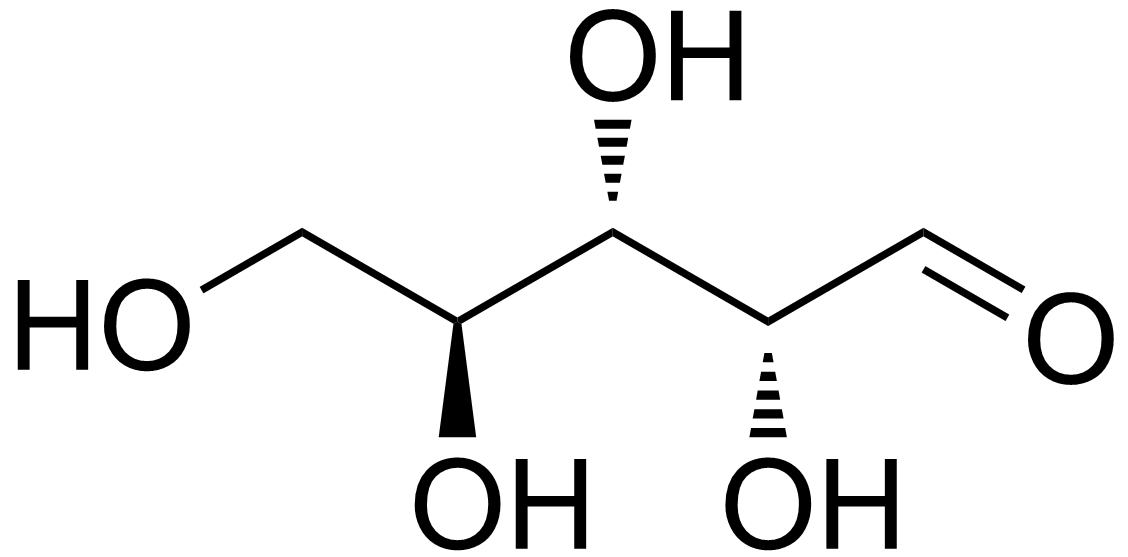
Arabinose

An arabinosyltransferase is a transferase enzyme acting upon arabinose. This enzyme is involved in polymerisation of arabinogalactan (an essential component of the mycobacterial cell wall). Mycobacterially, the more precise term is arabinofuranosyltransferase, since the arabinose residues occur only in a furanose form.

This enzyme has important clinical applications as it is believed to be the target of the antimycobacterial drug ethambutol.
