= Morinamide =

Anti-TB agent

Clinical data
- Trade names: Piazolina
- AHFS/Drugs.com: International Drug Names
- ATC code: J04AK04 (WHO)

Legal status
- Legal status: BR: Class A1 (Narcotic drugs)

Identifiers
- IUPAC name: N-(morpholin-4-ylmethyl)pyrazine-2-carboxamide
- CAS Number: 952-54-5
- PubChem CID: 70374
- ChemSpider: 63555
- UNII: 8CFL28PA3W
- KEGG: D07248
- CompTox Dashboard (EPA): DTXSID4046159
- ECHA InfoCard: 100.012.237

Chemical and physical data
- Formula: C_{10}H_{14}N_{4}O_{2}
- Molar mass: 222.248 g·mol^{−1}
- 3D model (JSmol): Interactive image
- SMILES: O=C(NCN1CCOCC1)c1cnccn1
- InChI: InChI=1S/C10H14N4O2/c15-10(9-7-11-1-2-12-9)13-8-14-3-5-16-6-4-14/h1-2,7H,3-6,8H2,(H,13,15); Key:GVTLAVKAVSKBKK-UHFFFAOYSA-N

Morinamide (or morphazinamide, or morinamid) is a drug used in the treatment of tuberculosis. Although morphazinamide is metabolized to pyrazinamide within the body, the drug itself has intrinsic in vitro activity.
