= Management of tuberculosis =

Disease treatment

Tuberculosis management
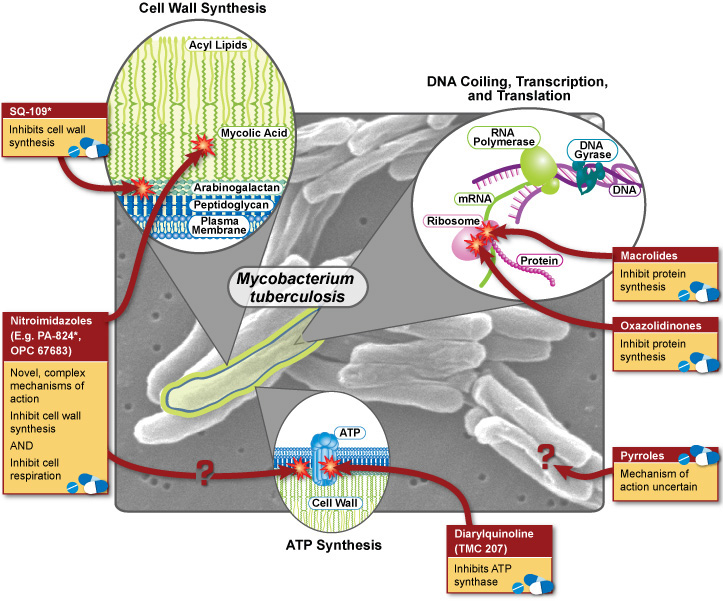
- Various pharmaceutical tuberculosis treatments and their actions
- Specialty: Infectious diseases

Management of tuberculosis refers to techniques and procedures utilized for treating tuberculosis (TB), or simply a treatment plan for TB.

The medical standard for active TB is a short course treatment involving a combination of isoniazid, rifampicin (also known as Rifampin), pyrazinamide, and ethambutol for the first two months. During this initial period, Isoniazid is taken alongside pyridoxal phosphate to obviate peripheral neuropathy. Isoniazid is then taken concurrently with rifampicin for the remaining four months of treatment (6-8 months for miliary tuberculosis). A patient is expected to be free from all living TB bacteria after six months of therapy in Pulmonary TB or 8-10 months in Miliary TB.

Latent tuberculosis or latent tuberculosis infection (LTBI) is treated with three to nine months of isoniazid alone. This long-term treatment often risks the development of hepatotoxicity. A combination of isoniazid plus rifampicin for a period of three to four months is shown to be an equally effective method for treating LTBI, while mitigating risks to hepatotoxicity. Treatment of LTBI is essential in preventing the spread of active TB.

== Drugs ==
First line tuberculosis drugs
Drug	3-letter	1-letter
Ethambutol	EMB	E
Isoniazid	INH	H
Pyrazinamide	PZA	Z
Rifampicin	RMP	R
Streptomycin	STM	S
Second line tuberculosis drugs
Ciprofloxacin	CIP	(none)
Moxifloxacin	MXF	(none)
p-aminosalicylic acid	PAS	P

=== First line ===
All first-line anti-tuberculous drug names have semi-standardized three-letter and single-letter abbreviations:

- ethambutol is EMB or E
- isoniazid is INH or H
- pyrazinamide is PZA or Z
- rifampicin is RMP or R
- streptomycin is SM or S

First-line anti-tuberculous drug names are often remembered with the mnemonic "RIPE", referring to the use of rifamycin (like rifampin), isoniazid, pyrazinamide, and ethambutol.

In US practice, names and abbreviations that are not universally accepted are used. For example, rifampicin is referred to as rifampin and is abbreviated as RIF, while streptomycin is referred to as STM. The notations RIF, RFP, and RMP have all been frequently used for rifampicin, and the notations IRPE, HRZE, RIPE, and IREP for combination regimens are all synonyms or nearly synonyms depending on dosage schedules. Other abbreviations have also been widely used).

In this system, which the World Health Organization (WHO) supports, "RIPE" is "RHZE". (Both have mnemonic potential, as tuberculosis is named after tubercles (small tubers), and a tuber can be ripe and can be a rhizome.) This regimen is also known as "HREZ".

Drug regimens are similarly abbreviated in a semi standardized manner. The drugs are listed using their single letter abbreviations (in the order given above, which is roughly the order of introduction into clinical practice). A prefix denotes the number of months the treatment should be given for; a subscript denotes intermittent dosing (so _{3} means three times a week) and no subscript means daily dosing.

Most regimens have an initial high-intensity phase, followed by a continuation phase (also called a consolidation phase or eradication phase): the high-intensity phase is given first, then the continuation phase, the two phases divided by a slash.

So,

2HREZ/4HR_{3}

means isoniazid, rifampicin, ethambutol, pyrazinamide daily for two months, followed by four months of isoniazid and rifampicin given three times a week. Several studies have shown that the combination of rifampicin, isoniazid, pyrazinamide has increase the risk of drug-induced liver injury.

In the US only, streptomycin is not considered a first line drug by ATS/IDSA/CDC because of high rates of resistance. WHO has made no such recommendation.

=== Second line ===
The second-line drugs (WHO groups 2, 3, and 4) are only used to treat disease that is resistant to first line therapy (i.e., for extensively drug-resistant tuberculosis (XDR-TB) or multidrug-resistant tuberculosis (MDR-TB)). A drug may be classified as second-line instead of first-line for one of three possible reasons: 1) it may be less effective than the first-line drugs (e.g., p-aminosalicylic acid), 2) it may have toxic side-effects (e.g., cycloserine), or 3) it may be effective, but unavailable in many developing countries (e.g., fluoroquinolones):

- aminoglycosides (WHO group 2): e.g., amikacin (AMK), kanamycin (KM)
- polypeptides (WHO group 2): e.g., capreomycin, viomycin, enviomycin
- fluoroquinolones (WHO group 3): e.g., ciprofloxacin (CIP), levofloxacin, moxifloxacin (MXF)
- thioamides (WHO group 4): e.g. ethionamide, prothionamide
- cycloserine (WHO group 4)
- terizidone (WHO group 5)

=== Third line ===
Third-line drugs (WHO group 5) include drugs that may be useful, but have doubtful or unproven efficacy:

- rifabutin
- macrolides: e.g., clarithromycin (CLR);
- linezolid (LZD);
- thioacetazone (T);
- thioridazine;
- arginine;
- vitamin D;
- bedaquiline.

These drugs are listed here either because they are not very effective (e.g., clarithromycin) or because their efficacy has not been proven (e.g., linezolid, R207910). Rifabutin is effective, but is not included on the WHO list because, for most developing countries, it is impractically expensive.

== Standard regimen ==
=== Rationale and evidence ===
Tuberculosis has been treated with combination therapy for over fifty years. Treatments consisting of a single drug are not used (except in latent TB or chemoprophylaxis), and regimens that use only single drug result in the rapid development of resistance and treatment failure. The rationale for using multiple drugs to treat TB is based on simple probability. The rate of spontaneous mutations that confer resistance to an individual drug are well known: 1 mutation for every 10^{7} cell divisions for EMB, 1 for every 10^{8} divisions for STM and INH, and 1 for every 10^{10} divisions for RMP.

Patients with extensive pulmonary TB have approximately 10^{12} bacteria in their body, and therefore will likely be harboring approximately 10^{5} EMB-resistant bacteria, 10^{4} STM-resistant bacteria, 10^{4} INH-resistant bacteria and 10² RMP-resistant bacteria. Resistance mutations appear spontaneously and independently, so the chances of them harbouring a bacterium that is spontaneously resistant to both INH and RMP is 1 in 10^{8} × 1 in 10^{10}=1 in 10^{18}, and the chance of them harbouring a bacterium that is spontaneously resistant to all four drugs is 1 in 10^{33}. This is, of course, an oversimplification, but it is a useful way of explaining combination therapy.

There are other theoretical reasons for supporting combination therapy. The different drugs in the regimen have different modes of action. INH are bactericidal against replicating bacteria. EMB is bacteriostatic at low doses, but is used in TB treatment at higher bactericidal doses. RMP is bacteriacidal and has a sterilizing effect. PZA is only weakly bactericidal, but is very effective against bacteria located in acidic environments, inside macrophages, or in areas of acute inflammation.

All TB regimens in use were 18 months or longer until the appearance of rifampicin. In 1953, the standard UK regimen was 3SPH/15PH or 3SPH/15SH_{2}. Between 1965 and 1970, EMB replaced PAS. RMP began to be used to treat TB in 1968 and the BTS study in the 1970s showed that 2HRE/7HR was efficacious. In 1984, a BTS study showed that 2HRZ/4HR was efficacious, with a relapse rate of less than 3% after two years. In 1995, with the recognition that INH resistance was increasing, the British Thoracic Society recommended adding EMB or STM to the regimen: 2HREZ/4HR or 2SHRZ/4HR, which are the regimens currently recommended. The WHO also recommend a six-month continuation phase of HR if the patient is still culture-positive after 2 months of treatment (approximately 15% of patients with fully sensitive TB) and for those patients who have extensive bilateral cavitation at the start of treatment.

=== Monitoring, DOTS, and DOTS-Plus ===
DOTS stands for "Directly Observed Treatment, Short-course" and is a major plank in the World Health Organization (WHO) Global Plan to Stop TB. The DOTS strategy focuses on five main points of action. The first element involves creating increased sustainable financial services and a short- and long-term plan provided by the government, dedicated to eliminating tuberculosis. The WHO helps encourage mobilized funding to reduce poverty standards that will prevent tuberculosis. The second component of the DOTS strategy is case detection, which involves improving the accuracy of laboratory tests for bacteriology and improving communication from labs to doctors and patients. Case detection means that laboratories that detect and test for bacteriology are accurate and communicative to its doctors and patients. The third strategy is to provide standard treatment and patient support. The guidelines to adhere to adequate treatment is to provide pharmaceutical drugs that will help eliminate tuberculosis and follow-up check-ups to ensure that tuberculosis is not a deterring factor in a patient's life. There are many cultural barriers as many patients might continue to work under unsanitary living conditions or not have enough money to pay for the treatments. Programs that provide stipends and incentives to allow citizens to seek treatment are also necessary. The fourth element to DOTS is to have a management program that supplies a sustainable long-term supply of reliable antibiotics. Lastly, the fifth component is to record and monitor treatment plans to ensure that the DOTS approach is effective. DOTS not only aims to provide structure for tuberculosis programs, but also to ensure that citizens diagnosed with tuberculosis adhere to protocols which will prevent future bacterial infections.

These include government commitment to control TB, diagnosis based on sputum-smear microscopy tests done on patients who actively report TB symptoms, direct observation short-course chemotherapy treatments, a definite supply of drugs, and standardized reporting and recording of cases and treatment outcomes. The WHO advises that all TB patients should have at least the first two months of their therapy observed (and preferably the whole of it observed): this means an independent observer watching patients swallow their anti-TB therapy. The independent observer is often not a healthcare worker and may be a shopkeeper or a tribal elder or similar senior person within that society. DOTS is used with intermittent dosing (thrice weekly or 2HREZ/4HR_{3}). Twice weekly dosing is effective but not recommended by the WHO, because there is no margin for error (accidentally omitting one dose per week results in once weekly dosing, which is ineffective).

Treatment with properly implemented DOTS has a success rate exceeding 95% and prevents the emergence of further multi-drug resistant strains of tuberculosis. Administering DOTS, decreases the possibilities of tuberculosis from recurring, resulting in a reduction in unsuccessful treatments. This is in part due to the fact that areas without the DOTS strategy generally provide lower standards of care. Areas with DOTS administration help lower the number of patients seeking help from other facilities where they are treated with unknown treatments resulting in unknown outcomes. However, if the DOTS program is not implemented or done so incorrectly positive results will be unlikely. For the program to work efficiently and accurately health providers must be fully engaged, links must be built between public and private practitioners, health services must be available to all, and global support is provided to countries trying to reach their TB prevention, and treatment aims. Some researchers suggest that, because the DOTS framework has been so successful in the treatment of tuberculosis in sub-Saharan Africa, DOTS should be expanded to non-communicable diseases such as diabetes mellitus, hypertension, and epilepsy.

=== DOTS-Plus strategy ===
The WHO extended the DOTS programme in 1998 to include the treatment of MDR-TB (called "DOTS-Plus"). Implementation of DOTS-Plus requires the capacity to perform drug-susceptibility testing (not routinely available even in developed countries) and the availability of second-line agents, in addition to all the requirements for DOTS. DOTS-Plus is therefore much more resource-expensive than DOTS, and requires much greater commitment from countries wishing to implement it. Community engagement is a new approach that is being initiated alongside the DOTS individualized treatment. By creating a community for health workers to give support to patients and hospital faculty, the DOTS-plus model also incorporates psychological structural support treatments to help accommodate patients to ensure completion of treatment. Treatment with the new strategy is a total duration of 18–24 months.

Monthly surveillance until cultures convert to negative is recommended for DOTS-Plus, but not for DOTS. If cultures are positive or symptoms do not resolve after three months of treatment, it is necessary to re-evaluate the patient for drug-resistant disease or nonadherence to drug regimen. If cultures do not convert to negative despite three months of therapy, some physicians may consider admitting the patient to hospital so as to closely monitor therapy.

=== Extra-pulmonary tuberculosis ===
Tuberculosis not affecting the lungs is called extrapulmonary tuberculosis. Disease of the central nervous system is specifically excluded from this classification.

The United Kingdom and the World Health Organization (WHO) recommendation is 2HREZ/4HR; the US recommendation is 2HREZ/7HR. There is good evidence from randomized controlled trials to say that in tuberculous lymphadenitis and in TB of the spine, the six-month regimen is equivalent to the nine-month regimen; the US recommendation is therefore not supported by the evidence.

Up to 25% of patients with TB of the lymph nodes (TB lymphadenitis) will get worse on treatment before they get better and this usually happens in the first few months of treatment. A few weeks after starting treatment, lymph nodes often start to enlarge, and previously solid lymph nodes may soften and develop into tuberculous cervical lymphadenitis. This should not be interpreted as failure of therapy and is a common reason for patients (and their physicians) to panic unnecessarily. With patience, two to three months into treatment the lymph nodes start to shrink again and re-aspiration or re-biopsy of the lymph nodes is unnecessary: if repeat microbiological studies are ordered, they will show the continued presence of viable bacteria with the same sensitivity pattern, which further adds to the confusion: physicians inexperienced in the treatment of TB will then often add second-line drugs in the belief that the treatment is not working. In these situations, all that is required is re-assurance. Steroids may be useful in resolving the swelling, especially if it is painful, but they are unnecessary. Additional antibiotics are unnecessary and the treatment regimen does not need to be lengthened.

There is no evidence that 6 months regimen is inadequate in treating abdominal TB and there is no additional benefits for 9-month regimen for preventing relapse.

However, more large scale studies are needed to confirm the above conclusion.

=== Tuberculosis of the central nervous system ===
Central nervous system tuberculosis takes two major forms: tuberculous meningitis and tuberculoma.

Tuberculosis may affect the central nervous system (meninges, brain, or spinal cord) in which case it is called TB meningitis, TB cerebritis, and TB myelitis respectively; the standard treatment is 12 months of drugs (2HREZ/10HR) and steroid are mandatory.

Diagnosis is difficult as CSF culture is positive in less than half of cases, and therefore a large proportion of cases are treated on the basis of clinical suspicion alone. PCR of CSF does not significantly improve the microbiology yield; culture remains the most sensitive method and a minimum of 5 mL (preferably 20 mL) of CSF should be sent for analysis. TB cerebritis (or TB of the brain) may require brain biopsy to make the diagnosis, because the CSF is commonly normal: this is not always available and even when it is, some clinicians would debate whether it is justified putting a patient through such an invasive and potentially dangerous procedure when a trial of anti-TB therapy may yield the same answer; probably the only justification for brain biopsy is when drug-resistant TB is suspected.

It is possible that shorter durations of therapy (e.g., six months) may be sufficient to treat TB meningitis, but no clinical trial has addressed this issue. The CSF of patients with treated TB meningitis is commonly abnormal even at 12 months; the rate of resolution of the abnormality bears no correlation with clinical progress or outcome, and is not an indication for extending or repeating treatment; repeated sampling of CSF by lumbar puncture to monitor treatment progress should therefore not be done.

Although TB meningitis and TB cerebritis are classified together, the experience of many clinicians is that their progression and response to treatment is not the same. TB meningitis usually responds well to treatment, but TB cerebritis may require prolonged treatment (up to two years) and the steroid course needed is often also prolonged (up to six months). Unlike TB meningitis, TB cerebritis often required repeated CT or MRI imaging of the brain to monitor progress.

Central nervous system TB may be secondary to blood-borne spread: therefore some experts advocate the routine sampling of CSF in patients with miliary TB.

The anti-TB drugs that are most useful for the treatment of Central nervous system TB are:

- INH (CSF penetration 100%)
- RMP (10–20%)
- EMB (25–50% inflamed meninges only)
- PZA (100%)
- STM (20% inflamed meninges only)
- LZD (20%)
- Cycloserine (80–100%)
- Ethionamide (100%)
- PAS (10–50%) (inflamed meninges only)

The use of steroids is routine in TB meningitis (see section below). There is evidence from one poorly designed trial that aspirin may be beneficial, but further work is required before this can be recommended routinely.

=== Steroids ===
The usefulness of corticosteroids (e.g., prednisolone or dexamethasone) in the treatment of TB is proven for TB meningitis and TB pericarditis. The dose for TB meningitis is dexamethasone 8 to 12 mg daily tapered off over six weeks (for those who prefer more precise dosing should refer to Thwaites et al., 2004). The dose for pericarditis is prednisolone 60 mg daily tapered off over four to eight weeks.

Steroids may be of temporary benefit in pleurisy, extremely advanced TB, and TB in children:

- Pleurisy: prednisolone 20 to 40 mg daily tapered off over 4 to 8 weeks
- Extremely advanced TB: 40 to 60 mg daily tapered off over 4 to 8 weeks
- TB in children: 2 to 5 mg/kg/day for one week, 1 mg/kg/day the next week, then tapered off over 5 weeks

Steroids may be of benefit in peritonitis, miliary disease, tubercular osteomyelitis, TB osteomyelitis, laryngeal TB, lymphadenitis, and genitourinary disease, but the evidence is scant and the routine use of steroids cannot be recommended. Steroid treatment in these patients should be considered on a case-by-case basis by the attending physician. The long-term impact of pleural TB on respiratory function is unknown. Therefore, such impact should be quantified first before assessing the need of further clinical trials of corticosteroids with pleural TB.

Thalidomide may be of benefit in TB meningitis and has been used in cases where patients have failed to respond to steroid treatment.

== Non-compliance ==
Patients who take their TB treatment in an irregular and unreliable way are at greatly increased risk of treatment failure, relapse, and the development of drug-resistant TB strains.

There are variety of reasons why patients fail to take their medication. The symptoms of TB commonly resolve within a few weeks of starting TB treatment and many patients then lose motivation to continue taking their medication. Regular follow-up is important to check on compliance and to identify any problems patients are having with their medication. Patients need to be told of the importance of taking their tablets regularly, and the importance of completing treatment, because of the risk of relapse or drug-resistance developing otherwise.

One of the main complaints is the bulkiness of the tablets. The main offender is PZA (the tablets being the size of horse tablets). PZA syrup may be offered as a substitute, or if the size of the tablets is truly an issue and liquid preparations are not available, then PZA can be omitted altogether. If PZA is omitted, the patient should be warned that this results in a significant increase in the duration of treatment (details of regimens omitting PZA are given below).

The other complaint is that the medicines must be taken on an empty stomach to facilitate absorption. This can be difficult for patients to follow (for example, shift workers who take their meals at irregular times) and may mean the patient waking up an hour earlier than usual everyday just to take medication. The rules are actually less stringent than many physicians and pharmacists realise: the issue is that the absorption of RMP is reduced if taken with fat, but is unaffected by carbohydrate, protein, or antacids. So the patient can in fact have his or her medication with food as long as the meal does not contain fat or oils (e.g., a cup of black coffee or toast with jam and no butter). Taking the medicines with food also helps ease the nausea that many patients feel when taking the medicines on an empty stomach. The effect of food on the absorption of INH is not clear: two studies have shown reduced absorption with food but one study showed no difference. There is a small effect of food on the absorption of PZA and of EMB that is probably not clinically important.

It is possible to test urine for isoniazid and rifampicin levels to check for compliance. The interpretation of urine analysis is based on the fact that isoniazid has a longer half-life than rifampicin:

- urine positive for isoniazid and rifampicin – patient probably fully compliant
- urine positive for isoniazid only – patient has taken his medication in the last few days preceding the clinic appointment, but had not yet taken a dose that day.
- urine positive for rifampicin only – patient has omitted to take his medication the preceding few days, but did take it just before coming to clinic.
- urine negative for both isoniazid and rifampicin – patient has not taken either medicine for a number of days

In countries where doctors are unable to compel patients to take their treatment (e.g., the UK), some say that urine testing only results in unhelpful confrontations with patients and does not help increase compliance. In countries where legal measures can be taken to force patients to take their medication (e.g., the US), then urine testing can be a useful adjunct in assuring compliance.

RMP colours the urine and all bodily secretions (tears, sweat, etc.) an orange-pink colour and this can be a useful proxy if urine testing is not available (although this colour fades approximately six to eight hours after each dose).

In study on cases of extra-pulmonary TB (EPTB), researchers at the University of the Philippines Manila found that similarity of symptoms of EPTB to other diseases results to delayed identification of the disease and late provision of medication. This, ultimately contribute to increasing rates of mortality and incidence rates of EPTB.

The World Health Organization (WHO) recommends prescription of fixed-dose combination drugs, to improve adherence to treatment by reducing the number of tablets that need to be taken by people, and also possibly reducing prescribing errors. A Cochrane review, published in 2016, found moderate quality evidence that "there is probably little or no difference in fixed-dose combination drugs compared to single-drug formulations".

=== Treatment adherence strategies ===
As stated above, non-compliance to anti-tuberculin treatment can result in treatment failure or development of drug-resistant tuberculosis. Therefore, overall treatment strategies should be focused on promoting adherence. WHO and the Centers for Disease Control and Prevention (CDC) recommend a multi-faceted patient centered care approach. Public health and private sector practitioners can promote TB treatment adherence by allowing patients to be active partners in making their own treatment decisions; improving patient's knowledge and understanding of tuberculosis disease, treatment, and potential spread; and by discussing expected interim and long-term outcomes with patients. CDC also recommends use of incentives and enablers. Incentives are monetary rewards for a healthy behavior (e.g.transport or food vouchers), while enablers function to remove economic burdens impeding healthcare access (e.g. grouping clinic visits, providing after hours clinic visits, or home visits). However, more research is needed to determine whether incentives and enablers have a significant effect on long-term treatment adherence for TB. Smartphones are considered to have potential to improve compliance.

Individuals with tuberculosis may also benefit from the emotional support of peers and survivors. Advocacy organizations and patient-support groups such as STOP TB, TB Alert, Treatment Action Group (TAG), and others work to connect TB survivors.

== Adverse effects ==
For information on adverse effects of individual anti-TB drugs, please refer to the individual articles for each drug.

The relative incidence of major adverse effects has been carefully described:

- INH 0.49 per hundred patient months
- RMP 0.43
- EMB 0.07
- PZA 1.48
- All drugs 2.47

This works out to an 8.6% risk that any one patient will need to have his drug therapy changed during the course of standard short-course therapy (2HREZ/4HR). The people identified to be most at risk of major adverse side effects in this study were:

- age >60,
- females,
- HIV positive patients, and
- Asians.

It can be extremely difficult identifying which drug is responsible for which side effect, but the relative frequency of each is known. The offending drugs are given in decreasing order of frequency:

- Thrombocytopenia: Rifampicin (RMP)
- Neuropathy: Isoniazid (INH)
- Vertigo: Streptomycin (STM)
- Hepatitis: Pyrazinamide (PZA), RMP, INH
- Rash: PZA, RMP, Ethambutol (EMB)

Thrombocytopenia is only caused by RMP and no test dosing need be done. Regimens omitting RMP are discussed below. Please refer to the entry on rifampicin for further details.

The most frequent cause of neuropathy is INH. The peripheral neuropathy of INH is always a pure sensory neuropathy and finding a motor component to the peripheral neuropathy should always prompt a search for an alternative cause. Once a peripheral neuropathy has occurred, INH must be stopped and pyridoxine should be given at a dose of 50 mg thrice daily. Simply adding high dose pyridoxine to the regimen once neuropathy has occurred will not stop the neuropathy from progressing. Patients at risk of peripheral neuropathy from other causes (diabetes mellitus, alcoholism, renal failure, malnutrition, pregnancy, etc.) should all be given pyridoxine 10 mg daily at the start of treatment. Please refer to the entry on isoniazid for details on other neurological side effects of INH.

Rashes are most frequently due to PZA, but can occur with any of the TB drugs. Test dosing using the same regimen as detailed below for hepatitis may be necessary to determine which drug is responsible.

Itching RMP commonly causes itching without a rash in the first two weeks of treatment: treatment should not be stopped and the patient should be advised that the itch usually resolves on its own. Short courses of sedative antihistamines such as chlorpheniramine may be useful in alleviating the itch.

Fever during treatment can be due to a number of causes. It can occur as a natural effect of tuberculosis (in which case it should resolve within three weeks of starting treatment). Fever can be a result of drug resistance (but in that case the organism must be resistant to two or more of the drugs). Fever may be due to a superadded infection or additional diagnosis (patients with TB are not exempt from getting influenza and other illnesses during the course of treatment). In a few patients, the fever is due to drug allergy. The clinician must also consider the possibility that the diagnosis of TB is wrong. If the patient has been on treatment for more than two weeks and if the fever had initially settled and then come back, it is reasonable to stop all TB medication for 72 hours. If the fever persists despite stopping all TB medication, then the fever is not due to the drugs. If the fever disappears off treatment, then the drugs need to be tested individually to determine the cause. The same scheme as is used for test dosing for drug-induced hepatitis (described below) may be used. The drug most frequently implicated as causing a drug fever is RMP: details are given in the entry on rifampicin.

=== Drug-induced hepatitis ===
Drug-induced hepatitis, from TB treatment, has a mortality rate of around 5%. Three drugs can induce hepatitis: PZA, INH, and RMP (in decreasing order of frequency). It is not possible to distinguish between these three causes based purely on signs and symptoms. Test dosing must be carried out to determine which drug is responsible (this is discussed in detail below).

Liver function tests (LFTs) should be checked at the start of treatment, but, if normal, need not be checked again; the patient need only be warned of the symptoms of hepatitis. Some clinicians insist on regular monitoring of LFT's while on treatment, and in this instance, tests need only be done two weeks after starting treatment and then every two months thereafter, unless any problems are detected.

Elevations in bilirubin must be expected with RMP treatment (RMP blocks bilirubin excretion) and usually resolve after 10 days (liver enzyme production increases to compensate). Isolated elevations in bilirubin can be safely ignored.

Elevations in liver transaminases (ALT and AST) are common in the first three weeks of treatment. If the patient is asymptomatic and the elevation is not excessive then no action need be taken; some experts suggest a cut-off of four times the upper limit of normal, but there is no evidence to support this particular number over and above any other number. Some experts consider that treatment should only be stopped if jaundice becomes clinically evident.

If clinically significant hepatitis occurs while on TB treatment, then all the drugs should be stopped until the liver transaminases return to normal. If the patient is so ill that TB treatment cannot be stopped, then STM and EMB should be given until the liver transaminases return to normal (these two drugs are not associated with hepatitis).

Fulminant hepatitis can occur in the course of TB treatment, but is fortunately rare; emergency liver transplantation may be necessary and deaths do occur.

=== Test dosing for drug-induced hepatitis ===
Drugs should be re-introduced individually. This cannot be done in an outpatient setting, and must be done under close observation. A nurse must be present to take patient's pulse and blood pressure at 15-minute intervals for a minimum of four hours after each test dose is given (most problems will occur within six hours of test dosing, if they are going to occur at all). Patients can become very suddenly unwell and access to intensive care facilities must be available. The drugs should be given in this order:

- Day 1: INH at 1/3 or 1/4 dose
- Day 2: INH at 1/2 dose
- Day 3: INH at full dose
- Day 4: RMP at 1/3 or 1/4 dose
- Day 5: RMP at 1/2 dose
- Day 6: RMP at full dose
- Day 7: EMB at 1/3 or 1/4 dose
- Day 8: EMB at 1/2 dose
- Day 9: EMB at full dose

No more than one test dose per day should be given, and all other drugs should be stopped while test dosing is being done. So on day 4, for example, the patient only receives RMP and no other drugs are given. If the patient completes the nine days of test dosing, then it is reasonable to assume that PZA has caused the hepatitis and no PZA test dosing need be done.

The reason for using the order for testing drugs is because the two most important drugs for treating TB are INH and RMP, so these are tested first: PZA is the most likely drug to cause hepatitis and is also the drug that can be most easily omitted. EMB is useful when the sensitivity pattern of the TB organism are not known and can be omitted if the organism is known to be sensitive to INH. Regimens omitting each of the standard drugs are listed below.

The order in which the drugs are tested can be varied according to the following considerations:

1. The most useful drugs (INH and RMP) should be tested first, because the absence of these drugs from a treatment regimen severely impairs its efficacy.
2. The drugs most likely to be causing the reaction should be tested as late as possible (and possibly need not be tested at all). This avoids rechallenging patients with a drug to which they have already had a (possibly) dangerous adverse reaction.

A similar scheme may be used for other adverse effects (such as fever and rash), using similar principles.

=== Dysbiosis caused by HRZE antibiotic treatment ===
Tuberculosis treatment results in changes to the structure of the gut microbiome both during and after treatment in mice and humans. It is currently unknown what the long term effects of this dysbiosis are on systemic immunity.

== Deviations from the standard regimen ==
There is evidence supporting some deviations from the standard regimen when treating pulmonary TB. Sputum culture-positive patients who are smear-negative at the start of treatment do well with only four months of treatment (this has not been validated for HIV-positive patients); sputum culture-negative patients do well on only three months of treatment (possibly because some of these patients never had TB at all). It is unwise to treat patients for only three or four months, but all TB physicians will have patients who stop their treatment early (for whatever reason), and it can be reassuring to know that sometimes retreatment is unnecessary. Elderly patients who are already taking a large number of tablets may be offered 9HR, omitting PZA which is the bulkiest part of the regimen.

It may not always be necessary to treat with four drugs from the beginning. An example might be a close contact of a patient known to have a fully sensitive strain of tuberculosis: in this case, it is acceptable to use 2HRZ/4HR (omitting EMB and STM) in the expectation that their strain will be INH susceptible also. Indeed, this was previously the recommended standard regimen in many countries until the early 1990s, when isoniazid-resistance rates increased.

TB involving the brain or spinal cord (meningitis, encephalitis, etc.) is currently treated with 2HREZ/10HR (12 months of treatment in total), but there is no evidence to say that this is superior to 2HREZ/4HR. There is no difference in relapse rates amongst those who are treated with 6 months or longer period of time. However, more well-designed studies are needed to answer this question.

=== Regimens omitting isoniazid ===
Isoniazid resistance accounts 6.9% of isolates in the UK (2010). Worldwide, it is the most common type of resistance encountered, hence the current recommendation of using HREZ at the beginning of treatment until sensitivities are known. It is useful to know of current reported outbreaks (like the current outbreak of INH-resistant TB in London).

If patients are discovered to be infected with an isoniazid-resistant strain of TB having completed 2 months of HREZ, then they should be changed to RE for a further 10 months, and the same thing if the patient is intolerant to isoniazid (although 2REZ/7RE may be acceptable if the patient is well supervised). The US recommendation is 6RZE with the option of adding a quinolone such as moxifloxacin. The level of evidence for all these regimens is poor, and there is little to recommend one over the other.

=== Regimens omitting rifampicin ===
The UK prevalence of rifampicin (RMP) resistance is 1.4%. It is rare for TB strains to be resistant to RMP without also being resistant to INH, which means that rifampicin-resistance usually means resistance to INH as well (that is, MDR-TB). However, RMP intolerance is not uncommon (hepatitis or thrombocytopaenia being the most common reasons for stopping rifampicin). Of the first-line drugs, rifampicin is also the most expensive, and in the poorest countries, regimens omitting rifampicin are therefore often used. Rifampicin is the most potent sterilising drug available for the treatment of tuberculosis and all treatment regimens that omit rifampicin are significantly longer than the standard regimen.

The UK recommendation is 18HE or 12HEZ. The US recommendation is 9 to 12HEZ, with the option of adding a quinolone (for example, MXF).

=== Regimens omitting pyrazinamide ===
PZA is a common cause of rash, hepatitis, and of painful arthralgia in the HREZ regimen, and can be safely stopped in those patients who are intolerant to it. Isolated PZA resistance is uncommon in M. tuberculosis, but M. bovis is innately resistant to PZA. PZA is not crucial to the treatment of fully sensitive TB, and its main value is in shortening the total treatment duration from nine months to six.

An alternative regimen is 2HRE/7HR, for which there is excellent clinical trial evidence. The 1994 US CDC guidelines for tuberculosis erroneously cite Slutkin as evidence that a nine-month regimen using only isoniazid and rifampicin is acceptable, but almost all of the patients in that study received ethambutol for the first two to three months (although this is not obvious from the abstract of that article). This mistake was rectified in the 2003 guidelines.

This regimen (2HRE/7HR) is the first-line regimen used to treat M. bovis, since M. bovis is intrinsically resistant to pyrazinamide.

=== Regimens omitting ethambutol ===
EMB intolerance or resistance is rare. If a patient is truly intolerant or is infected with TB that is resistant to EMB, then 2HRZ/4HR is an acceptable regimen. The main motivator for including EMB in the initial two months is because of increasing rates of INH resistance.

== Tuberculosis and other conditions ==
=== Liver disease ===
People with alcoholic liver disease are at an increased risk of tuberculosis. The incidence of tuberculous peritonitis is particularly high in patients with cirrhosis of the liver.

There are broadly two categories of treatment: A) Cirrhotic patients with essentially normal baseline liver function tests (Childs A Cirrhosis). Such patients may be treated with standard 4 drug regime for 2 months followed by 2 drugs for remaining 4 months (total 6-month treatment). B) Cirrhotic patients altered baseline liver function tests (Childs B & C). According to 2010 WHO guidelines: depending on the severity of the disease and degree of decompensation, the following regimen can be used, by altering the number of hepatotoxic drugs. One or two hepatotoxic drugs may be used in moderately severe disease (e.g., Childs B cirrhosis) whereas hepatotoxic drugs are completely avoided in decompensated Child C cirrhosis. • Two hepatotoxic drugs – 9 months of Isoniazid, Rifampin, and Ethambutol (until or unless isoniazid susceptibility is documented) – 2 months of Isoniazid, Rifampin, Ethambutol, and Streptomycin followed by 6 months of Isoniazid and Rifampin • One hepatotoxic drug – 2 months of Isoniazid, Ethambutol & Streptomycin followed by 10 months of Isoniazid and Ethambutol • No hepatotoxic drugs – 18–24 months of Streptomycin, Ethambutol, and quinolones. Patients with liver disease should have their liver function tests monitored regularly throughout TB treatment.

=== Pregnancy ===
Pregnancy itself is not a risk factor for TB.

Rifampicin makes hormonal contraception less effective, so additional precautions need to be taken for birth control while tuberculosis treatment.

Untreated TB in pregnancy is associated with an increased risk of miscarriage and major fetal abnormality, and treatment of pregnant women. The US guidelines recommend omitting PZA when treating TB in pregnancy; the UK and WHO guidelines make no such recommendation, and PZA is commonly used in pregnancy. There is extensive experience with the treatment of pregnant women with TB and no toxic effect of PZA in pregnancy has ever been found. High doses of RMP (much higher than used in humans) causes neural tube defects in animals, but no such effect has ever been found in humans. There may be an increased risk of hepatitis in pregnancy and during the puerperium. It is prudent to advise all women of child-bearing age to avoid getting pregnant until TB treatment is completed.

Aminoglycosides (STM, capreomycin, amikacin) should be used with caution in pregnancy, because they may cause deafness in the unborn child. The attending physician must weigh the benefits of treating the mother against the potential harm to the baby, and good outcomes have been reported in children whose mothers were treated with aminoglycosides. Experience in Peru shows that treatment for MDR-TB is not a reason to recommend termination of pregnancy, and that good outcomes are possible.

=== Kidney disease ===
People with kidney failure have a 10 to 30-fold increase in risk of getting TB. People with kidney disease who are being given immunosuppressive medications or are being considered for transplant should be considered for treatment of latent tuberculosis if appropriate.

Aminoglycosides (STM, capreomycin, and amikacin) should be avoided in patients with mild to severe kidney problems because of the increased risk of damage to the kidneys. If the use of aminoglycosides cannot be avoided (e.g., in treating drug-resistant TB) then serum levels must be closely monitored and the patient warned to report any side-effects (deafness in particular). If a person has end-stage kidney disease and has no useful remaining kidney function, then aminoglycosides can be used, but only if drug levels can be easily measured (often only amikacin levels can be measured).

In mild kidney impairment, no change needs to be made in dosing any of the other drugs routinely used in the treatment of TB. In severe chronic kidney disease (GFR<30), the EMB dose should be halved (or avoided altogether). The PZA dose is 20 mg/kg/day (UK recommendation) or three-quarters the normal dose (US recommendation), but not much published evidence is available to support this.

When using 2HRZ/4HR in patients on dialysis, the drugs should be given daily during the initial high-intensity phase. In the continuation phase, the drugs should be given at the end of each haemodialysis session and no dose should be taken on non-dialysis days.

=== HIV ===
In patients with HIV, treatment for the HIV should be delayed until TB treatment is completed, if possible.

The current UK guidance (provided by the British HIV Association) is

- CD4 count over 200—delay treatment until the six months of TB treatment are complete.
- CD4 count 100 to 200—delay treatment until the initial two-month intensive phase of therapy is complete
- CD4 count less than 100—the situation is unclear and patients should be enrolled in clinical trials examining this question. There is evidence that if these patients are managed by a specialist in both TB and HIV then outcomes are not compromised for either disease.

If HIV treatment has to be started while a patient is still on TB treatment, then the advice of a specialist HIV pharmacist should be sought. In general, there is no significant interactions with the NRTI's. Nevirapine should not be used with rifampicin. Efavirenz may be used, but dose used depends on the patient's weight (600 mg daily if weight less than 50 kg; 800 mg daily if weight greater than 50 kg). Efavirenz levels should be checked early after starting treatment (unfortunately, this is not a service routinely offered in the US, but is readily available in the UK). The protease inhibitors should be avoided if at all possible: patients on rifamycins and protease inhibitors have an increased risk of treatment failure or relapse.

The World Health Organization (WHO) warns against using thioacetazone in patients with HIV, because of the 23% risk of potentially fatal exfoliative dermatitis.

According to Caprisa 003 (SAPiT) Study the mortality in patients who were started on anti-retrovirals during TB treatment was 56% lower than those started after TB treatment was completed (hazard ratio 0.44 (95% CI: 0.25 to 0.79); p=0.003).

=== Epilepsy ===
INH may be associated with an increased risk of seizures. Pyridoxine 10 mg daily should be given to all epileptics taking INH. There is no evidence that INH causes seizures in patients who are not epileptic.

TB treatment involves numerous drug interactions with anti-epileptic drugs and serum drug levels should be closely monitored. There are serious interactions between rifampicin and carbamazepine, rifampicin and phenytoin, and rifampicin and sodium valproate. The advice of a pharmacist should always be sought.

=== COVID-19 ===
TB and COVID-19 are a "cursed duet" and need immediate attention. TB should be considered a risk factor for severe COVID disease and patients with TB should be prioritised for COVID-19 preventative efforts, including vaccination.

== Drug-resistance ==
=== Definitions ===
Multi-drug resistant tuberculosis (MDR-TB) is defined as TB that is resistant at least to INH and RMP. Isolates that are multi-resistant to any other combination of anti-TB drugs but not to INH and RMP are not classed as MDR-TB.

The World Health Organization (WHO) updated the definitions of pre-extensively drug-resistant tuberculosis (pre-XDR-TB) and extensively drug-resistant tuberculosis (XDR-TB) in 2021. Pre-XDR-TB is now defined as TB due to Mycobacterium tuberculosis strains that meet the criteria for multidrug-resistant or rifampicin-resistant tuberculosis (MDR/RR-TB) and are also resistant to any fluoroquinolone whereas XDR-TB is defined as TB due to Mycobacterium tuberculosis strains which met criteria for MDR (resistance to isoniazid and rifampicin) or RR-TB (resistance to rifampicin alone) and are also resistant to any fluoroquinolone (levofloxacin or moxifloxacin) as well as at least one additional Group A drug. Group A drugs are the most potent second-line medications used in the treatment regimens for drug-resistant TB and include levofloxacin, moxifloxacin, bedaquiline, and linezolid. The definitions of pre-XDR-TB and XDR-TB reflect the growing resistance of anti-TB medicines which limits the number of effective treatment options available to treating clinicians. Previously, "Extensively drug-resistant tuberculosis" (XDR-TB) was defined as MDR-TB , resistant to quinolones and also to any one of kanamycin, capreomycin, or amikacin. This definition should no longer be used, but is included here because many older publications refer to it.

The principles of treatment for MDR-TB and for XDR-TB are the same. The main difference is that XDR-TB is associated with a much higher mortality rate than MDR-TB, because of a reduced number of effective treatment options. The epidemiology of XDR-TB is currently not well studied, but it is believed that XDR-TB does not transmit easily in healthy populations, but is capable of causing epidemics in populations which are already stricken by HIV and therefore more susceptible to TB infection.

=== Epidemiology of drug-resistant TB ===
A 1997 survey of 35 countries found rates above 2% in about a third of the countries surveyed. The highest rates of drug-resistant TB were in the former USSR, the Baltic states, Argentina, India, and China, and was associated with poor or failing national Tuberculosis Control programmes. Likewise, the appearance of high rates of MDR-TB in New York city the early 1990s was associated with the dismantling of public health programmes by the Reagan administration.

Paul Farmer points out that the more expensive a treatment, the harder it is for poor countries to get. Farmer sees this as verging on denial of basic human rights. Africa is low in quality of treatment partly because many African cultures lack the 'concept of time' essential to the schedule of administration.

MDR-TB can develop in the course of the treatment of fully sensitive TB and this is always the result of patients missing doses or failing to complete a course of treatment.

Thankfully, MDR-TB strains appear to be less fit and less transmissible. It has been known of many years that INH-resistant TB is less virulent in guinea pigs, and the epidemiological evidence is that MDR strains of TB do not dominate naturally. A study in Los Angeles found that only 6% of cases of MDR-TB were clustered. This should not be a cause for complacency: it must be remembered that MDR-TB has a mortality rate comparable to lung cancer. It must also be remembered that people who have weakened immune systems (because of diseases such as HIV or because of drugs) are more susceptible to catching TB.

Children represent a susceptible population with increasing rates of MDR and XDR-TB. Since diagnosis in pediatric patients is difficult, large number of cases are not properly reported. Cases of pediatric XDR-TB have been reported in most countries including the United States.

In 2006 an outbreak of XDR-TB South Africa was first reported as a cluster of 53 patients in a rural hospital in KwaZulu-Natal, with all but one dying. The mean survival from sputum specimen collection to death was only 16 days and that the majority of patients had never previously received treatment for tuberculosis. This is the epidemic for which the acronym XDR-TB was first used, although TB strains that fulfil the current definition have been identified retrospectively, this was the largest group of linked cases ever found. Since the initial report in September 2006, cases have now been reported in most provinces in South Africa. As of 16 March 2007, there were 314 cases reported, with 215 deaths. It is clear that the spread of this strain of TB is closely associated with a high prevalence of HIV and poor infection control; in other countries where XDR-TB strains have arisen, drug-resistance has arisen from mismanagement of cases or poor patient compliance with drug treatment instead of being transmitted from person to person. This strain of TB does not respond to any of the drugs currently available in South Africa for first- or second-line treatment. It is now clear that the problem has been around for much longer than health department officials have suggested, and is far more extensive. By 23 November 2006, 303 cases of XDR-TB had been reported, of which 263 were in KwaZulu-Natal. Serious thought has been put to isolation procedures that may deny some patients their human rights, but which may be necessary to prevent further spread of this strain of TB.

=== Treatment of MDR-TB ===
The treatment and prognosis of MDR-TB are much more akin to that for cancer than to that for infection. It has a mortality rate of up to 80%, which depends on a number of factors, including

1. How many drugs the organism is resistant to (the fewer the better),
2. How many drugs the patient is given (patients treated with five or more drugs do better),
3. Whether an injectable drug is given or not (it should be given for the first three months at least),
4. The expertise and experience of the physician responsible,
5. How co-operative the patient is with treatment (treatment is arduous and long, and requires persistence and determination on the part of the patient),
6. Whether the patient is HIV positive or not (HIV co-infection is associated with an increased mortality).

Treatment courses are a minimum of 18 months and may last years; it may require surgery, though death rates remain high despite optimal treatment. That said, good outcomes are still possible. Treatment courses that are at least 18 months long and which have a directly observed component can increase cure rates to 69%.

The treatment of MDR-TB must be undertaken by a physician experienced in the treatment of MDR-TB. Mortality and morbidity in patients treated in non-specialist centres is significantly elevated compared to those patients treated in specialist centres.

In addition to the obvious risks (e.g., known exposure to a patient with MDR-TB), risk factors for MDR-TB include male sex, HIV infection, previous incarceration, failed TB treatment, failure to respond to standard TB treatment, and relapse following standard TB treatment.

A large proportion of people with MDR-TB are unable to access treatment due to what Paul Farmer describes as an "Outcome Gap". The majority of people struck with MDR-TB live in "resource-poor settings" and are denied treatment because international organizations have refused to make technologies available to countries who cannot afford to pay for treatment, the reason being that second line drugs are too expensive therefore treatment methods for MDR-TB are not sustainable in impoverished nations. Farmer argues that this is social injustice and we cannot allow people to die simply because they are faced with circumstances where they cannot afford "effective therapy".

Treatment of MDR-TB must be done on the basis of sensitivity testing: it is impossible to treat such patients without this information. If treating a patient with suspected MDR-TB, the patient should be started on SHREZ+MXF+cycloserine pending the result of laboratory sensitivity testing.

A gene probe for rpoB is available in some countries and this serves as a useful marker for MDR-TB, because isolated RMP resistance is rare (except when patients have a history of being treated with rifampicin alone). If the results of a gene probe (rpoB) are known to be positive, then it is reasonable to omit RMP and to use SHEZ+MXF+cycloserine. The reason for maintaining the patient on INH despite the suspicion of MDR-TB is that INH is so potent in treating TB that it is foolish to omit it until there is microbiological proof that it is ineffective.

There are also probes available for isoniazid-resistance (katG and mabA-inhA), but these are less widely available.

When sensitivities are known and the isolate is confirmed as resistant to both INH and RMP, five drugs should be chosen in the following order (based on known sensitivities):

- an aminoglycoside (e.g., amikacin, kanamycin) or polypeptide antibiotic (e.g., capreomycin)
- PZA
- EMB
- a fluoroquinolones: moxifloxacin is preferred (ciprofloxacin should no longer be used;
- rifabutin
- cycloserine
- a thioamide: prothionamide or ethionamide
- PAS
- a macrolide: e.g., clarithromycin
- linezolid
- high-dose INH (if low-level resistance)
- interferon-γ
- thioridazine
- meropenem and clavulanic acid

Drugs are placed nearer the top of the list because they are more effective and less toxic; drugs are placed nearer the bottom of the list because they are less effective or more toxic, or more difficult to obtain.

Resistance to one drug within a class generally means resistance to all drugs within that class, but a notable exception is rifabutin: rifampicin-resistance does not always mean rifabutin-resistance and the laboratory should be asked to test for it. It is only possible to use one drug within each drug class. If it is difficult finding five drugs to treat then the clinician can request that high level INH-resistance be looked for. If the strain has only low level INH-resistance (resistance at 0.2 mg/L INH, but sensitive at 1.0 mg/L INH), then high dose INH can be used as part of the regimen. When counting drugs, PZA and interferon count as zero; that is to say, when adding PZA to a four drug regimen, you must still choose another drug to make five. It is not possible to use more than one injectable (STM, capreomycin, or amikacin), because the toxic effect of these drugs is additive: if possible, the aminoglycoside should be given daily for a minimum of three months (and perhaps thrice weekly thereafter). Ciprofloxacin should not be used in the treatment of tuberculosis if other fluoroquinolones are available.

There is no intermittent regimen validated for use in MDR-TB, but clinical experience is that giving injectable drugs for five days a week (because there is no-one available to give the drug at weekends) does not seem to result in inferior results. Directly observed therapy certainly helps to improve outcomes in MDR-TB and should be considered an integral part of the treatment of MDR-TB.

Response to treatment must be obtained by repeated sputum cultures (monthly if possible). Treatment for MDR-TB must be given for a minimum of 18 months and cannot be stopped until the patient has been culture-negative for a minimum of nine months. It is not unusual for patients with MDR-TB to be on treatment for two years or more.

Patients with MDR-TB should be isolated in negative-pressure rooms, if possible. Patients with MDR-TB should not be accommodated on the same ward as immunosuppressed patients (HIV infected patients, or patients on immunosuppressive drugs). Careful monitoring of compliance with treatment is crucial to the management of MDR-TB (and some physicians insist on hospitalisation if only for this reason). Some physicians will insist that these patients are isolated until their sputum is smear negative, or even culture negative (which may take many months, or even years). Keeping these patients in hospital for weeks (or months) on end may be a practical or physical impossibility and the final decision depends on the clinical judgement of the physician treating that patient. The attending physician should make full use of therapeutic drug monitoring (particularly of the aminoglycosides) both to monitor compliance and to avoid toxic effects.

Some supplements may be useful as adjuncts in the treatment of tuberculosis, but for the purposes of counting drugs for MDR-TB, they count as zero (if you already have four drugs in the regimen, it may be beneficial to add arginine, vitamin D, or both, but you still need another drug to make five).

- arginine, some clinical evidence (peanuts are a good source)
- Vitamin D (some in-vitro evidence; see Vitamin D and tuberculosis treatment)

The drugs listed below have been used in desperation and it is uncertain whether they are effective at all. They are used when it is not possible to find five drugs from the list above.

- imipenem
- co-amoxiclav
- clofazimine
- prochlorperazine
- metronidazole

On 28 December 2012 the US Food and Drug Administration (FDA) approved bedaquiline (marketed as Sirturo by Johnson & Johnson) to treat multi-drug resistant tuberculosis, the first new treatment in 40 years. Sirturo is to be used in a combination therapy for patients who have failed standard treatment and have no other options. Sirturo is an adenosine triphosphate synthase (ATP synthase) inhibitor.

The follow drug is experimental compounds that are not commercially available, but which may be obtained from the manufacturer as part of a clinical trial or on a compassionate basis. Their efficacy and safety are unknown:

- Pretomanid (manufactured by Novartis, developed in partnership with TB Alliance)

There is increasing evidence for the role of surgery (lobectomy or pneumonectomy) in the treatment of MDR-TB, although whether this is should be performed early or late is not yet clearly defined.

See Modern surgical management

== Management in Asia ==
The Asia‐Pacific region carries 58% of the global tuberculosis burden, which includes multi drug-resistant tuberculosis. Southeast Asia has high burdens of tuberculosis as a result of inefficient and inadequate health infrastructures. According to the World Health Organization, many Asian countries have high cases of tuberculosis, but their governments will not invest in new technology to treat its patients.

=== Philippines ===
From 2005 to 2009, the IPHO-Maguindanao, a governmental organization in Maguindanao, Philippines, partnered with the Catholic Relief Services (CRS) to increase tuberculosis awareness. CRS implemented a USAID-assisted project to fund tuberculosis testing. Additionally, they launched an "Advocacy, Communication, and Self-Mobilization" project featuring workshops to encourage testing in communities. Citizens attending religious sermons were able to distribute information about tuberculosis and inform their communities on where to seek treatment and how to adhere to treatment protocols The DOTS-Plus strategy, designed to deliver from within familiar local institutions, was successful at conveying information about tuberculosis prevention and treatment.

=== India ===
In 1906, India opened its first air sanitatorium for treatment and isolation of TB patients. However, the World Health Organization (WHO) reviewed the national program in India which lacked funding and treatment regimens that could report accurate tuberculosis case management. By 1945, there were successful immunization screenings due to campaigns that helped spread messages about the prevention of disease. This was also around the same time that the WHO declared tuberculosis to be a global emergency and recommended countries adopt the DOTS strategy.

=== Bangladesh, Cambodia, Thailand ===
In Bangladesh, Cambodia, and Indonesia, there is a diagnostic treatment for latent tuberculosis in children below five years of age. The IGRA approach (Interferon Gamma Release Assay) is used in these countries. IGRA testing and diagnosis are whole blood cell tests where fresh blood samples are mixed with antigens and controls. A person infected with tuberculosis will have interferon-gammas in the blood stream when mixed with the antigen. It is a highly accurate but expensive test and is technologically complex for immuno-compromised patients. These developing countries were unable to get rid of tuberculosis effectively because the national health policies did not cover screening and testing for tuberculosis. There were also no programs in place to educate citizens and provide training for healthcare workers. Without the mobilization of sufficient resources and the backing of sustainable government funding, these developing countries failed to adequately provide the treatment and resources necessary to combat tuberculosis.

=== Vietnam ===
According to the WHO, Vietnam ranks 13th on the list of 22 countries with the highest tuberculosis burden in the world. Nearly 400 new cases of TB and 55 deaths occur each day in Vietnam. In 1989, the Ministry of Health in Vietnam addressed the tuberculosis burden by establishing the National Institute of Tuberculosis and Lung Diseases and implemented the DOTS strategy as a national priority. Vietnam's health service system consists of four different levels: the central level headed by the Ministry of Health (MOH), provincial health services, district health services, and commune health centers". These departments worked with the National Institute of Tuberculosis and Lung Diseases to ensure that there were treatment and prevention plans for long-term reduction of tuberculosis. In 2002, Vietnam also implemented a communication plan to provide accurate educational information to respond to any barriers or misperceptions about tuberculosis treatment. The government worked with the WHO, Center for Disease and Control Prevention, and local medical non-profits such as Friends for International Tuberculosis Relief to provide information about the causes of TB, sources of infection, how it is transmitted, symptoms, treatment, and prevention. The National Tuberculosis Control Program works closely with the primary health care system at the central, provincial, district, and commune levels which has proven to be an incredibly imperative measure of success.

== Tuberculosis non-profits in Asia ==
Friends for International TB Relief is a small non-governmental organization whose mission is to help prevent tuberculosis and the spreading of TB. FIT not only diagnoses patients, but also provides preventative tuberculosis detection to pilot a comprehensive patient-centered TB program that aims to stop TB transmission and reduce suffering. The organization focuses on island screening due to the high level of risk and burden the population faces. Through its method of search, treat, prevent, and integrative sustainability, FIT is working closely with most of the population on the island (roughly 2022 patients), and partnered with the Ho Chi Minh City Public Health Association on a pilot that provides active community outreach, patient-centric care and stakeholder engagement.

Located in Ha Noi, the National Institute of Tuberculosis and Lung Diseases is responsible for the direction and management of TB control activities at the central level. The institute supports the MOH in developing TB- related strategies, and in handling management and professional guidelines for the system. The provincial level centers diagnose, treat, and manage patients, implement TB policies issued by the NTP, and develop action plans under the guidelines of the Provincial Health Bureau and the provincial TB control committees. The districts are capable of detecting TB and treating patients. All districts have physicians specializing in TB, laboratories, and X-ray equipment and have either a TB department or a TB-communicable diseases department in the district hospital. The district level is also responsible for implementing and monitoring the NTP, and the supervision and management of TB programs in the communes. The commune level provides treatment as prescribed by the district level, administering drugs, and vaccinating children. In TB control, village health workers play critically important roles in identifying suspected TB patients, conducting counseling for examination and tests, paying home visits to patients undergoing treatment, and reporting problems in monthly meetings with the CHC.

TB Alliance is a non-governmental organization that is located in South Africa and was discovered in the early 2000s. The NGO is a leading non-profit for global tuberculosis research and development of new TB vaccines. To advance TB development, TB Alliance creates partnerships with private, public, academic, and philanthropic sectors to develop products in underserved communities. In 2019, TB Alliance became the first not-for-profit organization to develop and register an anti-TB drug. TB Alliance also works closely alongside the World Health Organization (WHO), U.S FDA, and the European Medicine Agency (EMA) to endorse regulative policies and treatments that are affordable.

FHI 360 is an international tuberculosis non-profit organization funded by USAID to treat and support patients in Myanmar, China, and Thailand. The organization developed an app called DOTsync for healthcare staff to administer antibiotics and monitor the side effects of patients. This is incredibly imperative to eliminating tuberculosis because it allows healthcare workers to have follow-up checkups with patients to ensure that tuberculosis treatments are effective.

Operation ASHA is a TB nonprofit organization that was founded in 2006. Located in India and Cambodia, Operation ASHA focuses on the development of "e-Compliance", which is a verification and SMS text messaging system where patients can use their fingerprints to access their medical records and be reminded daily via text when to take their medication. According to Operation ASHA, the e-Compliance treatment successive rate is 85%.

== Treatment failure ==
Patients who fail treatment must be distinguished from patients who relapse. Patients who responded to treatment and appeared to be cured after completing a course of TB treatment are not classed as treatment failures, but as relapses and are discussed in a separate section below.

Patients are said to have failed treatment if they

1. fail to respond to treatment (cough and sputum production persisting throughout the whole of treatment), or
2. only experience a transient response to treatment (the patient gets better at first, but then get worse again, all the while on treatment).

It is very uncommon for patients not to respond to TB treatment at all (even transiently), because this implies resistance at base-line to all of the drugs in the regimen. Patients who fail to get any response at all while on treatment should first of all be questioned very closely about whether or not they have been taking their medicines, and perhaps even be admitted to hospital to be observed taking their treatment. Blood or urine samples may be taken to check for malabsorption of TB drugs. If it can be shown that they are fully compliant with their medication, then the probability that they have another diagnosis (perhaps in addition to the diagnosis of TB) is very high. These patients should have their diagnosis carefully reviewed and specimens obtained for TB culture and sensitivity testing. Patients who get better and then get worse again should likewise be questioned very closely about adherence to treatment. If adherence is confirmed then they should be investigated for resistant TB (including MDR-TB), even if a specimen has already been obtained for microbiology before commencing treatment.

Prescription or dispensing errors will account for a proportion of patients who fail to respond to treatment. Immune defects are a rare cause of non-response. In a tiny proportion of patients, treatment failure is a reflection of extreme biological variation and no cause is found.

== Treatment relapse ==
Patients are said to relapse if they improve while on treatment, but become ill again after stopping treatment. Patients who experience only a transient improvement while on treatment, or who never respond to treatment are said to have failed treatment and are discussed above.

There is a small relapse rate associated with all treatment regimens, even if the treatment has been taken religiously with 100% compliance (the standard regimen 2HREZ/4HR has a relapse rate of 2 to 3% under trial conditions). The majority of relapses occur within 6 months of finishing treatment. Patients who are more likely to relapse are those who took their medication in an unreliable and irregular fashion.

The probability of resistance is higher in those patients who relapse and every effort must be made to obtain a specimen that can be cultured for sensitivities. That said, most patients who relapse do so with a fully sensitive strain and it is possible that these patients have not relapsed, but have instead been re-infected; these patients can be re-treated with the same regimen as before (no drugs need to be added to the regimen and the duration need not be any longer).

The WHO recommends a regimen of 2SHREZ/6HRE when microbiology is not available (the majority of countries where TB is highly endemic). This regimen was designed to provide optimal treatment for fully sensitive TB (the most common finding in patients who have relapsed) as well as to cover the possibility of INH-resistant TB (the most common form of resistance found).

Because of the lifelong risk of relapse, all patients should be warned of the symptoms of TB relapse upon finishing treatment and given strict instructions to return to their doctor if symptoms recur.

== Public health and health policy ==
As of 2010, India has more reported cases of TB than any other country. This is in part due to severe mismanagement of diagnosis and treatment of TB within the private health care sector of India that serves about 50% of the population. There are therefore calls for the private sector to engage in the public Revised National Tuberculosis Control Program that has proved effective in reducing TB amongst the patients receiving health care through the government. Additionally, a study by Maurya et al. conducted in 2013 shows evidence that there is a burden of multidrug-resistant tuberculosis in India and change is needed for testing, surveillance, monitoring, and management. During the COVID-19 pandemic, 80% fewer TB cases were reported daily in April 2020 in India, reducing the diagnosis and treatment of TB.

== Trial of therapy ==
In areas where TB is highly endemic, it is not unusual to encounter patient with a fever, but in whom no source of infection is found. The physician may then, after extensive investigation has excluded all other diseases, resort to a trial of TB treatment. The regimen used is HEZ for a minimum of three weeks; RMP and STM are omitted from the regimen because they are broad spectrum antibiotics, whereas the other three first-line drugs treat only mycobacterial infection. Resolution of the fever after three weeks of treatment is good evidence for occult TB and the patient should then be changed to conventional TB treatment (2HREZ/4HR). If the fever does not resolve after three weeks of treatment then it is reasonable to conclude that the patient has another cause for his fever.

This approach is not recommended by the WHO and most national guidelines.

== Surgical treatment ==
Surgery has played an important part in the management of tuberculosis since the 1930s.

=== Historical surgical management ===
The first successful treatments for tuberculosis were all surgical. They were based on the observation that healed tuberculous cavities were all closed. Surgical management was therefore directed at closing open cavities to encourage healing. These procedures were all used in the pre-antibiotic era. There exists a myth that surgeons believed that the purpose was to deprive the organism of oxygen: it was however well known that the organism survives anaerobic conditions. Although these procedures may be considered barbaric by 21st century's standards, it must be remembered that these treatments represented a potential cure for a disease that at the time had a mortality at least as bad as lung cancer in 2000s.

Recurrent or persistent pneumothorax
The simplest and earliest procedure was to introduce air into the pleural space so as to collapse the affected lung and therefore the open cavity. There was always spontaneous resolution of the pneumothorax and the procedure had to be repeated every few weeks.
Phrenic nerve crush
The phrenic nerve (which supplies the diaphragm) was cut or crushed so as to permanently paralyse the diaphragm on that side. The paralysed diaphragm would then rise up and the lung on that side would collapse, thus closing the cavity.
Thoracoplasty
When the cavity was located in the apex of the lung, thoracoplasty could be performed. Six to eight ribs were broken and pushed into the thoracic cavity to collapse the lung beneath. This was a disfiguring operation, but it avoided the need for repeated procedures. In the Novosibirsk TB Research Institute (Russia), osteoplastic thoracoplasty (a variant of extrapleural thoracoplasty) has been used for the last 50 years for patients with complicated cavitary forms of TB for whom lung resection is contraindicated.
Plombage
Plombage reduced the need for a disfiguring operation. It involved inserting porcelain balls into the thoracic cavity to collapse the lung underneath.

Surgical resections of infected lungs were rarely attempted during the 1930s and 1940s, due to the extremely high perioperative mortality rate.

=== Modern surgical management ===
In modern times, the surgical treatment of tuberculosis is confined to the management of multi-drug resistant TB. A patient with MDR-TB who remains culture positive after many months of treatment may be referred for lobectomy or pneumonectomy with the aim of cutting out the infected tissue. The optimal timing for surgery has not been defined, and surgery still confers significant morbidity. The centre with the largest experience in the US is the National Jewish Medical and Research Center in Denver, Colorado. From 1983 to 2000, they performed 180 operations in 172 patients; of these, 98 were lobectomies, and 82 were pneumonectomies. They report a 3.3% operative mortality, with an additional 6.8% dying following the operation; 12% experienced significant morbidity (particularly extreme breathlessness). Of 91 patients who were culture positive before surgery, only 4 were culture positive after surgery.

Some complications of treated tuberculosis like recurrent hemoptysis, destroyed or bronchiectasic lungs, and empyema (a collection of pus in the pleural cavity) are also amenable to surgical therapy.

In extrapulmonary TB, surgery is often needed to make a diagnosis (rather than to effect a cure): surgical excision of lymph nodes, drainage of abscesses, tissue biopsy, etc. are all examples of this. Samples taken for TB culture should be sent to the laboratory in a sterile pot with no additive (not even water or saline) and must arrive in the laboratory as soon as possible. Where facilities for liquid culture are available, specimens from sterile sites may be inoculated directly following the procedure: this may improve the yield. In spinal TB, surgery is indicated for spinal instability (when there is extensive bony destruction) or when the spinal cord is threatened. Therapeutic drainage of tuberculous abscesses or collections is not routinely indicated and will resolve with adequate treatment. In TB meningitis, hydrocephalus is a potential complication and may necessitate the insertion of a ventricular shunt or drain.

== Nutrition ==
It is well known that malnutrition is a strong risk factor for becoming unwell with TB, that TB is itself a risk factor for malnutrition, and that malnourished patients with TB (BMI less than 18.5) are at an increased risk of death even with appropriate antibiotic therapy. Knowledge about the association between malnutrition and TB is prevalent in some cultures, and may reduce diagnostic delay and improve adherence to treatment.

Although blood levels of some micronutrients may be low in people starting treatment for active tuberculosis, a Cochrane review of thirty-five included trials concluded that there is insufficient research to know whether the routine provision of free food or energy supplements improves tuberculosis treatment outcomes. However, nutritional supplementation probably improves weight gain in some settings.

=== Vitamin D and tuberculosis epidemiology ===
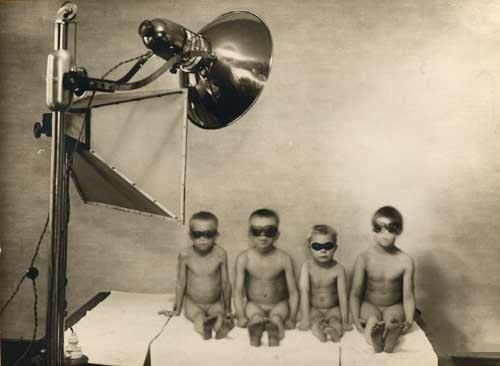
Tuberculosis phototherapy treatment on 3 March 1934 in Kuopio, Finland

Vitamin D deficiency is a risk factor for tuberculosis, and vitamin D deficiency appears to impair the body's ability to fight tuberculosis, but there is no clinical evidence to show that treating vitamin D deficiency prevents tuberculosis, although the available evidence is that it ought to. Reduced levels of vitamin D may explain the increased susceptibility of African-Americans to tuberculosis, and may also explain why phototherapy is effective for lupus vulgaris (tuberculosis of the skin) (a finding which won Niels Finsen the Nobel Prize in 1903), because skin exposed to sunlight naturally produces more vitamin D.

Concerns that tuberculosis treatment itself decreases vitamin D levels appear not to be an issue in clinical practice.

Genetic differences in the vitamin D receptor in West African, Gujarati and Chinese populations have been noted to affect susceptibility to tuberculosis, but there is no data available in any population that shows vitamin D supplementation (that is, giving extra vitamin D to people with normal vitamin D levels) has any effect on susceptibility to TB.

=== Vitamin D and tuberculosis treatment ===
Giving vitamin D to TB patients who are vitamin D deficient may be beneficial in a proportion of patients. When taken as a group, vitamin D supplementation appears to have no benefit when using sputum culture conversion as an endpoint, and giving vitamin D supplements to TB patients who have normal vitamin D levels does not provide any benefit from the point of view of TB. In a subset of patients with the tt genotype of the TaqI vitamin D receptor and who are vitamin D deficient, vitamin D supplementation appears to hasten sputum culture conversion. There are no studies of vitamin D using the gold standard outcome of relapse, so the true benefit of vitamin D is not at present known.

It was noted as early as the mid-19th century that cod liver oil (which is rich in vitamin D) improved patients with tuberculosis, and the mechanism for this is probably an enhancement of immune responses to tuberculosis.

The addition of vitamin D appears to enhance the ability of monocytes and macrophages to kill M. tuberculosis in vitro as well as ameliorating potentially harmful effects of the human immune system. Another reason vitamin D can be used as a treatment for mycobacterial infections like tuberculosis is because of pro-anti-inflammatory cytokines that are influenced by vitamin D. Vitamin D has a post-anti-inflammatory effect on tuberculosis.

=== Other ===
- arginine has some clinical evidence as an adjuvant.
- Mycobacterium vaccae has been completed in Phase III trials by Anhui Zhifei Longcom Biologic Pharmacy Co., Ltd., injectable Vaccae(TM) and Immunitor LLC., oral tablet Tubivac (V7).

== Latent tuberculosis ==
The treatment of latent tuberculosis infection (LTBI) is essential to controlling and eliminating TB by reducing the risk that TB infection will progress to disease.

The terms "preventive therapy" and "chemoprophylaxis" have been used for decades and are preferred in the UK because it involves giving medication to people who have no active disease and are currently well, the reason for treatment is primarily to prevent people from becoming unwell. The term "latent tuberculosis treatment" is preferred in the US because the medication does not actually prevent infection: it prevents an existing silent infection from becoming active. The feeling in the US is that the term "treatment of LTBI" promotes wider implementation by convincing people that they are receiving treatment for disease. There are no convincing reasons to prefer one term over the other.

It is essential that assessment to rule out active TB is carried out before treatment for LTBI is started. To give LTBI treatment to someone with active TB is a serious error: the TB will not be adequately treated and there is a risk of developing drug-resistant strains of TB.

There are several treatment regimens available:

- 9H—Isoniazid for 9 months is the gold standard and is 93% effective.
- 6H—Isoniazid for 6 months might be adopted by a local TB program based on cost-effectiveness and patient compliance. This is the regimen currently recommended in the UK for routine use. The US guidance exclude this regimen from use in children or persons with radiographic evidence of prior tuberculosis (old fibrotic lesions). (69% effective)
- 6 to 9H_{2}—A twice-weekly regimen for the above two treatment regimens is an alternative if administered under Directly observed therapy (DOT).
- 4R—Rifampicin for 4 months is an alternative for those who are unable to take isoniazid or who have had known exposure to isoniazid-resistant TB.
- 3HR—Isoniazid and rifampicin may be given for 3 months.
- 2RZ—The 2-month regimen of rifampicin and pyrazinamide is no longer recommended for treatment of LTBI because of the greatly increased risk of drug-induced hepatitis and death.
- 3RPT/INH - 3-month (12-dose) regimen of weekly rifapentine and isoniazid.

Evidence for treatment effectiveness:

A 2000 Cochran review containing 11 double-blinded, randomized control trials and 73,375 patients examined six- and 12-month courses of isoniazid (INH) for treatment of latent tuberculosis. HIV positive and patients currently or previously treated for tuberculosis were excluded. The main result was a relative risk (RR) of 0.40 (95% confidence interval (CI) 0.31 to 0.52) for development of active tuberculosis over two years or longer for patients treated with INH, with no significant difference between treatment courses of six or 12 months (RR 0.44, 95% CI 0.27 to 0.73 for six months, and 0.38, 95% CI 0.28 to 0.50 for 12 months).
A 2013 systematic review published by the Cochrane Collaboration, compared Rifamycins (monotheraphy and combination therapy) to INH monotheraphy as an alternative in preventing active TB in HIV negative populations. The evidence suggested that shorter Rifampicin regimes (3 or 4 months) had higher treatment completion rates and fewer adverse events when compared to INH. However, the overall quality of evidence as per GRADE criteria was low to moderate. Another meta-analysis came to a similar conclusion, namely that rifamycin-containing regimens taken for 3 months or longer had a better profile in preventing TB reactivation.

== Research ==
Research into shortening tuberculosis treatment has focused on developing regimens that can achieve treatment outcomes comparable to the conventional six-month regimen while reducing treatment duration and pill burden. A major development came from TBTC Study 31/ACTG A5349, an international phase III randomized controlled trial that evaluated four-month regimens for drug-susceptible pulmonary tuberculosis. The regimen containing isoniazid, rifapentine, moxifloxacin and pyrazinamide for the first two months, followed by isoniazid, rifapentine and moxifloxacin for a further two months (2HPMZ/2HPM), demonstrated non-inferiority to the standard six-month regimen in the study population.

Following assessment of the research evidence on TBTC study 31, the World Health Organization recommended the four-month rifapentine-moxifloxacin regimen in 2022 for eligible people aged 12 years or older with pulmonary drug-susceptible tuberculosis. The regimen consists of eight weeks of daily isoniazid, rifapentine, moxifloxacin and pyrazinamide, followed by nine weeks of daily isoniazid, rifapentine and moxifloxacin.

The shorter regimen is intended for selected patients and is not appropriate for all forms of tuberculosis. WHO guidance excludes, among others, patients weighing less than 40 kg, those with severe extrapulmonary tuberculosis, children younger than 12 years, pregnant or breastfeeding women, and people living with HIV with a CD4 count below 100 cells/mm³ from use of this particular four-month regimen. The standard six-month regimen therefore remains an important treatment option for patients who do not meet the eligibility criteria for the shorter regimen.

Although the four-month regimen has been recommended since 2022, its implementation has remained limited. According to the World Health Organization's 2025 Global Tuberculosis Report, 4,154 people diagnosed with tuberculosis were reported to have started the four-month HPMZ regimen during 2024, compared with 1,271 in 2023. By the end of 2024, 15 countries and areas had reported using the regimen, compared with five in 2023. The TRUNCATE-TB trial evaluated a strategy of stopping treatment early in selected patients with rifampicin-susceptible tuberculosis after an initial eight-week regimen containing bedaquiline, linezolid, isoniazid, pyrazinamide and ethambutol. Although the strategy supported the feasibility of shorter treatment in selected patients, concerns regarding relapse and acquired drug resistance have been raised, particularly when such regimens are implemented in settings with challenges in treatment adherence and prescribing. Research into shorter treatment has also extended to drug-resistant tuberculosis. Clinical trials have evaluated shorter all-oral regimens incorporating newer and repurposed drugs such as bedaquiline, delamanid, linezolid, pretomanid and fluoroquinolones. Findings from these studies have contributed to changes in international treatment recommendations, including the introduction of shorter regimens for multidrug-resistant and rifampicin-resistant tuberculosis in updated WHO guidelines.

== History ==
Streptomycin and para-aminosalicylic acid were developed by the mid-1940s. In 1960, Edinburgh City Hospital physician Sir John Crofton, addressed the Royal College of Physicians in London with a lecture titled "Tuberculosis Undefeated", and proposed that "the disease could be conquered, once and for all". With his colleagues at Edinburgh, he recognised that germs that developed only a mild resistance to one drug was significant. His team showed that when treating new cases of TB, strict compliance to a combination of three therapies, or the triple therapy, (streptomycin, para-aminosalicylic acid and isoniazid) could provide a complete cure. It became known as the 'Edinburgh method' and became standard treatment for at least 15 years. In the 1970s it was recognised that combining isoniazid and rifampin could reduce the duration of treatment from 18 to nine months, and in the 1980s the duration of treatment was further shortened by adding pyrazinamide.

== National and international guidelines ==
- Organization, World Health (2010). Treatment of tuberculosis: guidelines, 4th edition (4th ed.). World Health Organization (WHO). hdl:10665/44165. ISBN 978-92-4-154783-3.
- Latent tuberculosis infection: updated and consolidated guidelines for programmatic management. World Health Organization (WHO). 2018. hdl:10665/260233. ISBN 978-92-4-155023-9. WHO/CDS/TB/2018.4 Licence: CC BY-NC-SA 3.0 IGO. Archived from the original on 27 February 2018.
- International standards for tuberculosis care (3rd ed.). World Health Organization (WHO). 2014. Archived from the original on 19 December 2015.
- "Tuberculosis". National Institute for Health and Clinical Excellence (UK). September 2019.
- American Thoracic Society; CDC; Infectious Diseases Society of America (June 2003). "Treatment of tuberculosis" (PDF). MMWR. Recommendations and Reports. 52 (RR-11): 1–77. PMID 12836625.
- "Targeted tuberculin testing and treatment of latent tuberculosis infection. This official statement of the American Thoracic Society was adopted by the ATS Board of Directors, July 1999. This is a Joint Statement of the American Thoracic Society (ATS) and the Centers for Disease Control and Prevention (CDC). This statement was endorsed by the Council of the Infectious Diseases Society of America. (IDSA), September 1999, and the sections of this statement". American Journal of Respiratory and Critical Care Medicine. 161 (4 Pt 2): S221-47. April 2000. doi:10.1164/ajrccm.161.supplement_3.ats600. PMID 10764341. S2CID 758421.
- "Targeted tuberculin testing and treatment of latent tuberculosis infection. American Thoracic Society" (PDF). MMWR. Recommendations and Reports. 49 (RR-6): 1–51. June 2000. PMID 10881762.
- "TB Guidelines". U.S. Centers for Disease Control and Prevention (CDC). 28 May 2020.

== See also ==
- Modern era
  - ATC code J04 Drugs for treatment of TB
  - Mantoux test
  - Heaf test
  - TB Alliance
- Tuberculosis management in the era before antituberculosis drugs
  - History of tuberculosis
  - Tuberculosis treatment in Colorado Springs (historical)
