= KatG =

KatG is an enzyme that functions as both catalase and peroxidase, a catalase-peroxidase. In Mycobacterium tuberculosis, mutations in KatG are commonly associated with resistance to the antibiotic drug isoniazid, which targets the mycolic acids within M. tuberculosis, and more general multi-drug resistance. Due to both its catalase and peroxidase activity, this enzyme protects M. tuberculosis against reactive oxygen species. M. tuberculosis' survival within macrophages depends on the KatG enzyme.
