= PncA =

Bacterial gene

Nicotinamidase/pyrazinamidase

Identifiers
- Organism: Mycobacterium tuberculosis
- Symbol: pncA
- UniProt: I6XD65
Search for
- Structures: Swiss-model
- Domains: InterPro

PncA is a bacterial gene encoding a nicotinamidase that doubles as a pyrazinamidase in Mycobacterium species. Nicotinamidase converts nicotinamide to nicotinic acid where as pyrazinamidase converts the drug pyrazinamide to its active form pyrazinoic acid.

Missense mutations in this gene in Mycobacterium is strongly correlated with resistance to pyrazinamide, likely due to a loss of the ability to produce pyrazinoic acid. Mutagenesis data indicates that many loss-of-function mutations differentially affect the enzyme's ability to convert nicotinamide and pyrazinamide.

The H57D resistance mutation is "typical of" M. bovis.

The symbol PncA is also used for the orthologous nicotinamidase in other bacterial species, including E. coli.

== See also ==
- Pyrazinamide
