= Pyrazinoic acid =

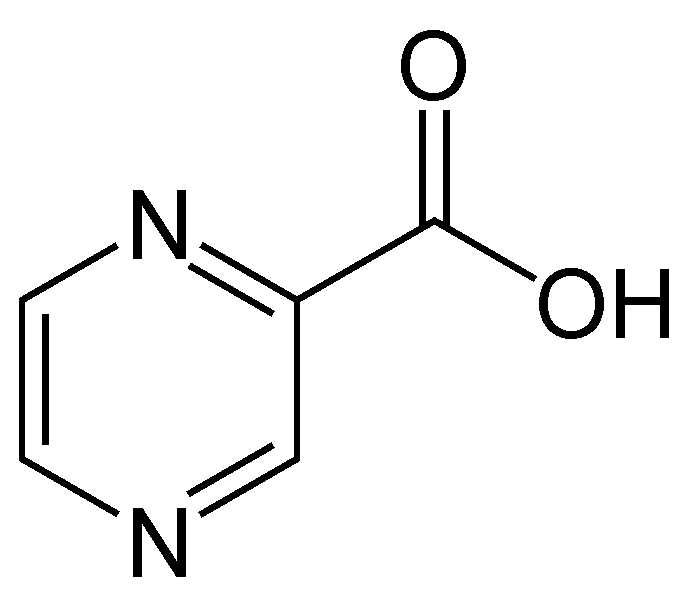

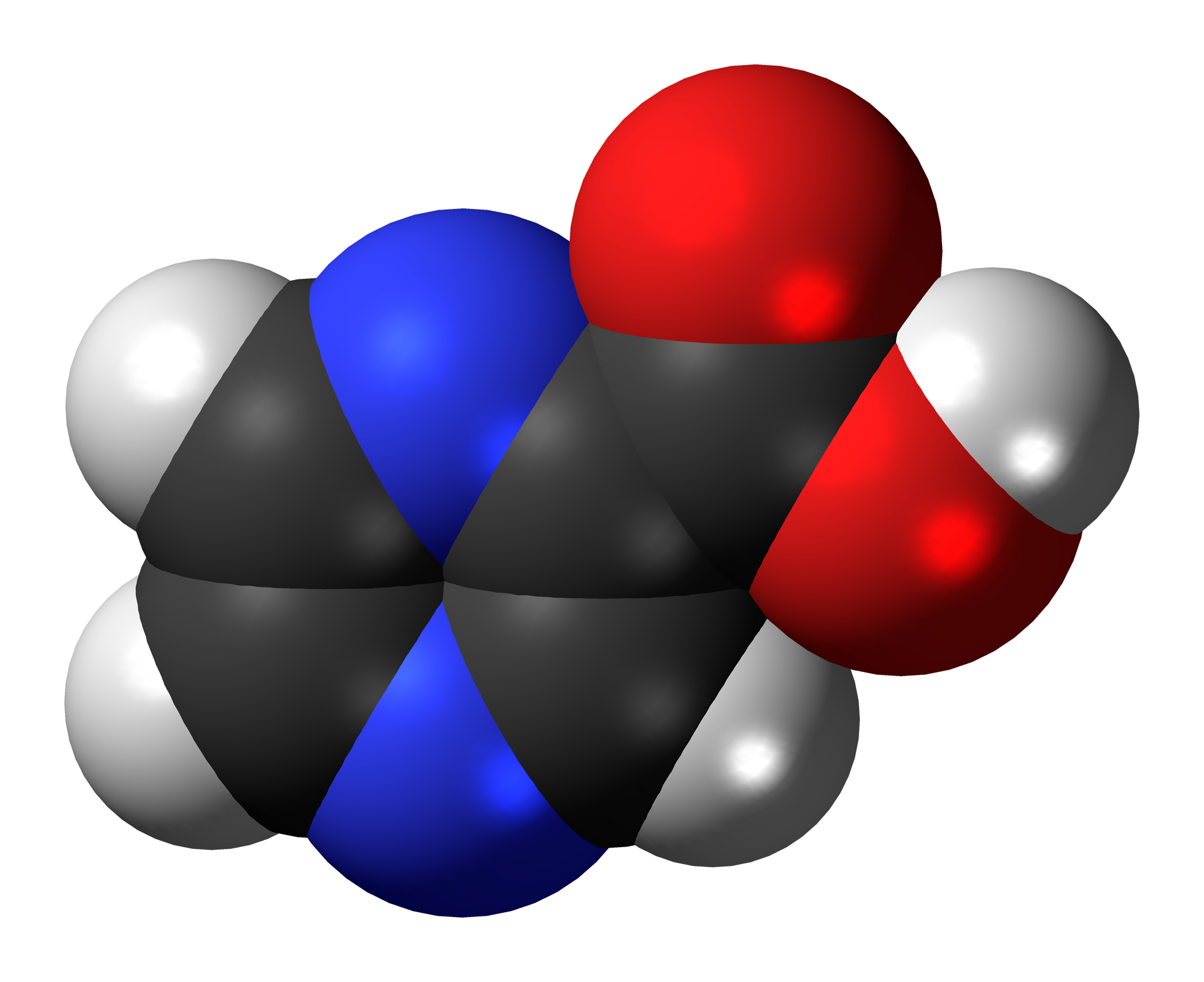

Names
- Preferred IUPAC name Pyrazine-2-carboxylic acid

Identifiers
CAS Number	98-97-5
3D model (JSmol)	Interactive image
ChEBI	CHEBI:71311
ChEMBL	ChEMBL613
ChemSpider	1018
ECHA InfoCard	100.002.471
MeSH	Pyrazinoic+acid
PubChem CID	1047
UNII	2WB23298SP
CompTox Dashboard (EPA)	DTXSID30243367
- InChI: InChI=1S/C5H4N2O2/c8-5(9)4-3-6-1-2-7-4/h1-3H,(H,8,9) Key: NIPZZXUFJPQHNH-UHFFFAOYSA-N; InChI=1/C5H4N2O2/c8-5(9)4-3-6-1-2-7-4/h1-3H,(H,8,9) Key: NIPZZXUFJPQHNH-UHFFFAOYAS
- SMILES: O=C(O)c1nccnc1

Properties
Chemical formula	C_{5}H_{4}N_{2}O_{2}
Molar mass	124.10 g/mol
Appearance	white to off white crystalline powder
Density	1.403g/cm^{3}
Melting point	222 to 225 °C (432 to 437 °F; 495 to 498 K)
Boiling point	313.1 °C (595.6 °F; 586.2 K) at 760 mmHg
Solubility in water	soluble in cold water
Acidity (pK_{a})	2.9

Hazards
Flash point	143.1 °C (289.6 °F; 416.2 K)
- Except where otherwise noted, data are given for materials in their standard state (at 25 °C [77 °F], 100 kPa). verify (what is ?) Infobox references

Pyrazinoic acid (POA) is a pyrazinamide (PZA) metabolite. Mycobacterium tuberculosis pyrazinamidase converts pyrazinamide into this compound, the active form of pyrazinamide. The cognate anion is called pyrazinoate.

It inhibits panD, the aspartate 1-decarboxylase. It also inhibits Rv2783 (gpsI), a polyribonucleotide nucleotidyltransferase and guanosine pentaphosphate synthetase.

== Role in tuberculosis treatment ==
One way M. tuberculosis becomes resistant to PZA is by disabling the pyrazinamidase by through mutations. Using another chemical precursor to POA could bypass this problem. (POA cannot be directly used because it is not lipophilic enough to cross the bacterial cell membrane at physiological pH, being mostly ionized.)

One group of proposed alternative prodrugs is the esters of POA (pyrazinoate esters). It has been shown in vitro that their MICs are lower than PZA, meaning they are more potent antibiotics. Moreover, they cross the bacterial membrane more easily, due to their higher lipophilicity.
