= Protionamide =

Chemical compound

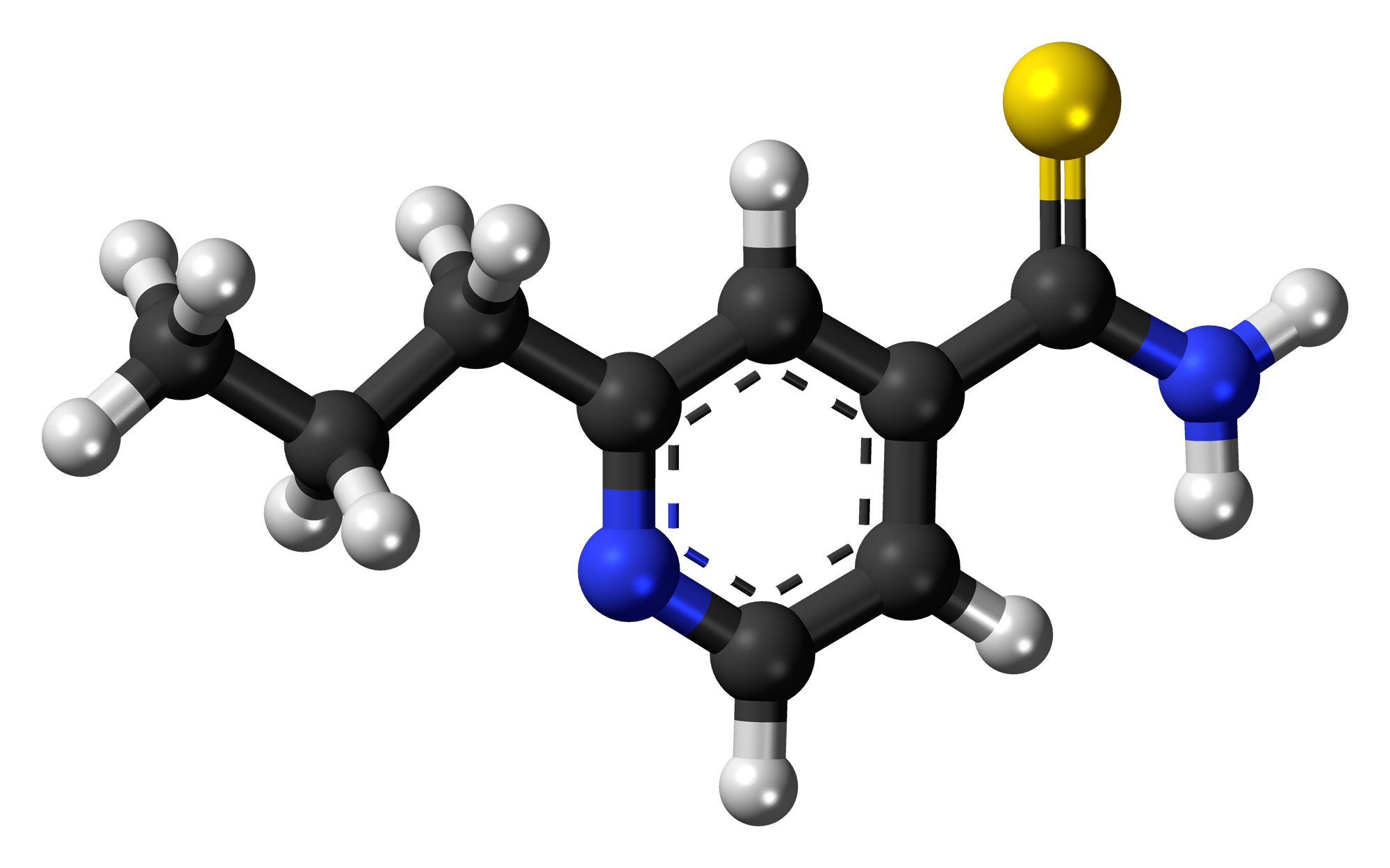

Clinical data
- AHFS/Drugs.com: International Drug Names
- ATC code: J04AD01 (WHO)

Identifiers
- IUPAC name: 2-propylpyridine-4-carbothioamide
- CAS Number: 14222-60-7
- PubChem CID: 666418
- DrugBank: DB12667
- ChemSpider: 579891
- UNII: 76YOO33643
- CompTox Dashboard (EPA): DTXSID7045940
- ECHA InfoCard: 100.034.615

Chemical and physical data
- Formula: C_{9}H_{12}N_{2}S
- Molar mass: 180.27 g·mol^{−1}
- 3D model (JSmol): Interactive image
- SMILES: CCCc1cc(ccn1)C(=S)N
- InChI: InChI=1S/C9H12N2S/c1-2-3-8-6-7(9(10)12)4-5-11-8/h4-6H,2-3H2,1H3,(H2,10,12); Key:VRDIULHPQTYCLN-UHFFFAOYSA-N

Protionamide (or prothionamide) is a medication used in the treatment of tuberculosis and leprosy.

Protionamide is a therapeutic alternative on the World Health Organization's List of Essential Medicines.
