= ATC code J04 =

ATC code J04 Antimycobacterials is a therapeutic subgroup of the Anatomical Therapeutic Chemical Classification System, a system of alphanumeric codes developed by the World Health Organization (WHO) for the classification of drugs and other medical products. Subgroup J04 is part of the anatomical group J Antiinfectives for systemic use.

Codes for veterinary use (ATCvet codes) can be created by placing the letter Q in front of the human ATC code: for example, QJ04.
National versions of the ATC classification may include additional codes not present in this list, which follows the WHO version.

== J04A Drugs for treatment of tuberculosis ==
=== J04AA Aminosalicylic acid and derivatives ===
J04AA01 Aminosalicylic acid
J04AA02 Sodium aminosalicylate
J04AA03 Calcium aminosalicylate

=== J04AB Antibiotics ===
J04AB01 Cycloserine
J04AB02 Rifampicin
J04AB03 Rifamycin
J04AB04 Rifabutin
J04AB05 Rifapentine
J04AB06 Enviomycin
J04AB30 Capreomycin

=== J04AC Hydrazides ===
J04AC01 Isoniazid
J04AC02 Ftivazide
J04AC51 Isoniazid, combinations

=== J04AD Thiocarbamide derivatives ===
J04AD01 Protionamide
J04AD02 Tiocarlide
J04AD03 Ethionamide

=== J04AK Other drugs for treatment of tuberculosis ===
J04AK01 Pyrazinamide
J04AK02 Ethambutol
J04AK03 Terizidone
J04AK04 Morinamide
J04AK05 Bedaquiline
J04AK06 Delamanid
J04AK07 Amithiozone
J04AK08 Pretomanid

=== J04AM Combinations of drugs for treatment of tuberculosis ===
J04AM01 Streptomycin and isoniazid
J04AM02 Rifampicin and isoniazid
J04AM03 Ethambutol and isoniazid
J04AM04 Thioacetazone and isoniazid
J04AM05 Rifampicin, pyrazinamide and isoniazid
J04AM06 Rifampicin, pyrazinamide, ethambutol and isoniazid
J04AM07 Rifampicin, ethambutol and isoniazid
J04AM08 Isoniazid, sulfamethoxazole and trimethoprim
J04AM09 Pyrazinamide, ethambutol, isoniazid and lomefloxacin
J04AM10 Pyrazinamide, ethambutol, protionamide and lomefloxacin
J04AM11 Rifabutin, pyrazinamide and protionamide
J04AM12 Rifampicin, pyrazinamide, isoniazid and levofloxacin

== J04B Drugs for treatment of lepra ==
=== J04BA Drugs for treatment of lepra ===
J04BA01 Clofazimine
J04BA02 Dapsone
J04BA03 Aldesulfone sodium
J04BA50 Dapsone and rifampicin
J04BA51 Dapsone, rifampicin and clofazimine
