= Catalase-peroxidase =

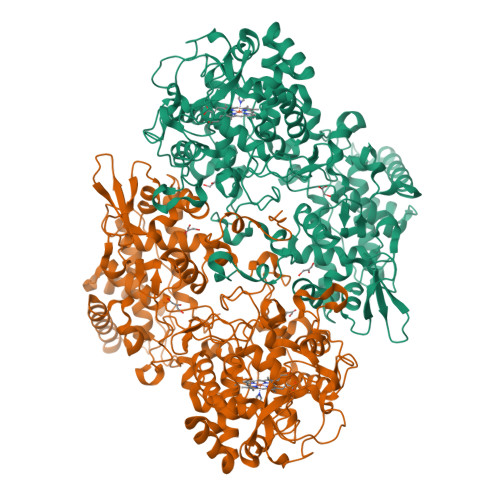
- Crystal structure of Mycobacterium tuberculosis catalase-peroxidase

Identifiers
- EC no.: 1.11.1.21

Databases
- IntEnz: IntEnz view
- BRENDA: BRENDA entry
- ExPASy: NiceZyme view
- KEGG: KEGG entry
- MetaCyc: metabolic pathway
- PRIAM: profile
- PDB structures: RCSB PDB PDBe PDBsum
Search
- PMC: articles
- PubMed: articles
- NCBI: proteins

Catalase-peroxidase, systematically named donor:hydrogen-peroxide oxidoreductase, is a bifunctional enzyme capable of catalyzing both catalase- and peroxidase-type reactions. Its main role is in oxidative stress defense.

== Reaction pathway ==
Catalase-peroxidase facilitates two types of reactions: A catalase type reaction:

2 H_{2}O_{2} ⇌ O_{2} + 2 H_{2}O

where reactive hydrogen peroxide is converted to water and oxygen.

And a peroxidase type reaction:

donor + H_{2}O_{2} ⇌ oxidized donor + 2 H_{2}O

These reactions occur in multiple steps. Both the catalytic and peroxidic reactions require the same initial step:

1) catalase-peroxidase (Porphyrin-Fe^{III}) + H_{2}O_{2} → Compound I (Porphyrin^{+}-Fe^{IV}=O) + H_{2}O

Here the CP associated porphyrin ferric iron (Fe³⁺) is oxidized by the cleaving of hydrogen peroxide to form Compound I, an oxyferryl (Fe^{4+}) intermediate

The catalytic reaction continues as follows:

2) Compound I + H_{2}O_{2} → catalase-peroxidase (Porphyrin-Fe^{III}) + H_{2}O + O_{2}

which uses a second hydrogen peroxide molecule to reduce Compound I and returns CP back to its active state.

Then the peroxidic reaction:

3) Compound I + electron donor → Compound II (Porphyrin- -Fe^{IV}=OH) + oxidized donor

4) Compound II + electron donor → catalase-peroxidase (Porphyrin-Fe^{III}) + oxidized donor

which requires the addition of alternative electron donor (other than hydrogen peroxide) to return the enzyme to first a second intermediate, Compound II, then its active state in low hydrogen peroxide conditions.

NADH in some organisms may be used as the electron donor in the peroxidic reactions however catalase-peroxidase has also been described to have some role in catalyzing the oxidation of NADH (though less favourable than its other reactions) where:

NADH + O_{2} + H → NAD^{+} + H_{2}O_{2}

or NADH + 2O_{2} → NAD^{+} + 2O_{2}

== Organisms ==
Catalase-peroxidase has been described in bacteria, fungus and most recently in dinoflagellates.

Mycobacterium tuberculosis CP (mtCP) enzyme is most largely researched catalase-peroxidase because of its role in the activation of the antibiotic Isoniazid (INH). This drug was developed to treat tuberculosis in humans by inhibiting cell wall synthesis in M. tuberculosis. INH is administered in its inactive form and can only be transformed into its active form by the oxidizing ability of a M. tuberculosis specific enzyme, mtCP.

CPs have also been extensively described in the bacteria, Burkholderia pseudomallei, Escherichia coli along with being found in many others.

The discovery of catalase-peroxidase in eukaryotic dinoflagellates (e.g., Symbiodinium sp.) is novel, as these enzymes were previously thought to be restricted to prokaryotes and fungi. It is hypothesized that this may have arisen from a horizontal gene transfer or endosymbiotic event, wherein a dinoflagellate incorporated a bacterium possessing the katG gene, which has since persisted functionally in certain species.

== Crystal structures ==
Catalase-peroxidase typically forms homodimers or homotetramers, consisting of identical ~80 kDa subunits. These subunits interact through hydrophobic residues (notably tyrosine and tryptophan) and are stabilized by a characteristic methionine–tyrosine–tryptophan covalent cross-link, which reinforces subunit association.

Each monomer consists of two predominantly α-helical domains:

- The N-terminal domain houses the active site and a heme b prosthetic group.
- The C-terminal domain contributes to structural stability and dimerization.

Two prominent structural loops, LL1 and LL2, are characteristic of catalase-peroxidases. LL1 is stabilized by a conserved amino acid motif: Met–Gly–Leu–Ile–Tyr–Val–Asn–Pro–Glu–Gly.

=== Active site ===
The active site of catalase-peroxidase generally includes one tryptophan, two histidines, one arginine, and the heme b iron ligand, coordinated through histidine residues. This site is buried deep within the enzyme and connected to the solvent exterior via a narrow channel formed by the LL1 and LL2 loops. The restricted access to the heme group is thought to regulate substrate binding and minimize uncontrolled peroxide reactions.

=== How structure ties to function ===
The intricate heme environment, coupled with the dual-domain organization' and LL1/LL2 channel architecture, allows catalase-peroxidase to efficiently mediate both catalase and peroxidase reactions. The presence of the covalent Met–Tyr–Trp linkage enhances stability under oxidative stress and facilitates rapid electron transfer during compound I formation. The distal conserved tyrosine residue (part of the Met-Tyr-Trp linkage) has been shown to be essential to the specific structure of Catalase-peroxidase as exchanging this residue can convert CPs to a monofunctional peroxidase.
