= Terizidone =

Tuberculosis medication

Clinical data
- Trade names: Terivalidin
- Other names: 4-[({4-[N-(3-oxo-1,2-oxazolidin-4-yl)carboximidoyl]phenyl}methylidene)amino]-1,2-oxazolidin-3-one
- AHFS/Drugs.com: International Drug Names
- ATC code: J04AK03 (WHO)

Identifiers
- IUPAC name: 4,4'-{1,4-phenylenebis[(E)methylylidene (E)azanylylidene]}bis(1,2-oxazolidin-3-one)
- CAS Number: 25683-71-0
- PubChem CID: 65720
- ChemSpider: 59144
- UNII: 1199LEX5N8
- KEGG: D07247
- CompTox Dashboard (EPA): DTXSID70905098
- ECHA InfoCard: 100.042.882

Chemical and physical data
- Formula: C_{14}H_{14}N_{4}O_{4}
- Molar mass: 302.290 g·mol^{−1}
- 3D model (JSmol): Interactive image
- SMILES: O=C3NOCC3/N=C/c2ccc(/C=N/C1C(=O)NOC1)cc2
- InChI: InChI=1S/C14H14N4O4/c19-13-11(7-21-17-13)15-5-9-1-2-10(4-3-9)6-16-12-8-22-18-14(12)20/h1-6,11-12H,7-8H2,(H,17,19)(H,18,20)/b15-5+,16-6+; Key:ODKYYBOHSVLGNU-IAGONARPSA-N

Terizidone is a drug used in the treatment of tuberculosis. Terizidone is mainly used in multi-drug-resistant tuberculosis (MDR-TB) in conjunction with other second-line drugs. It is a derivative of cycloserine with bacteriostatic activity.

Terizidone is a therapeutic alternative on the World Health Organization's List of Essential Medicines.
