= Pyrazinamide =

Medication

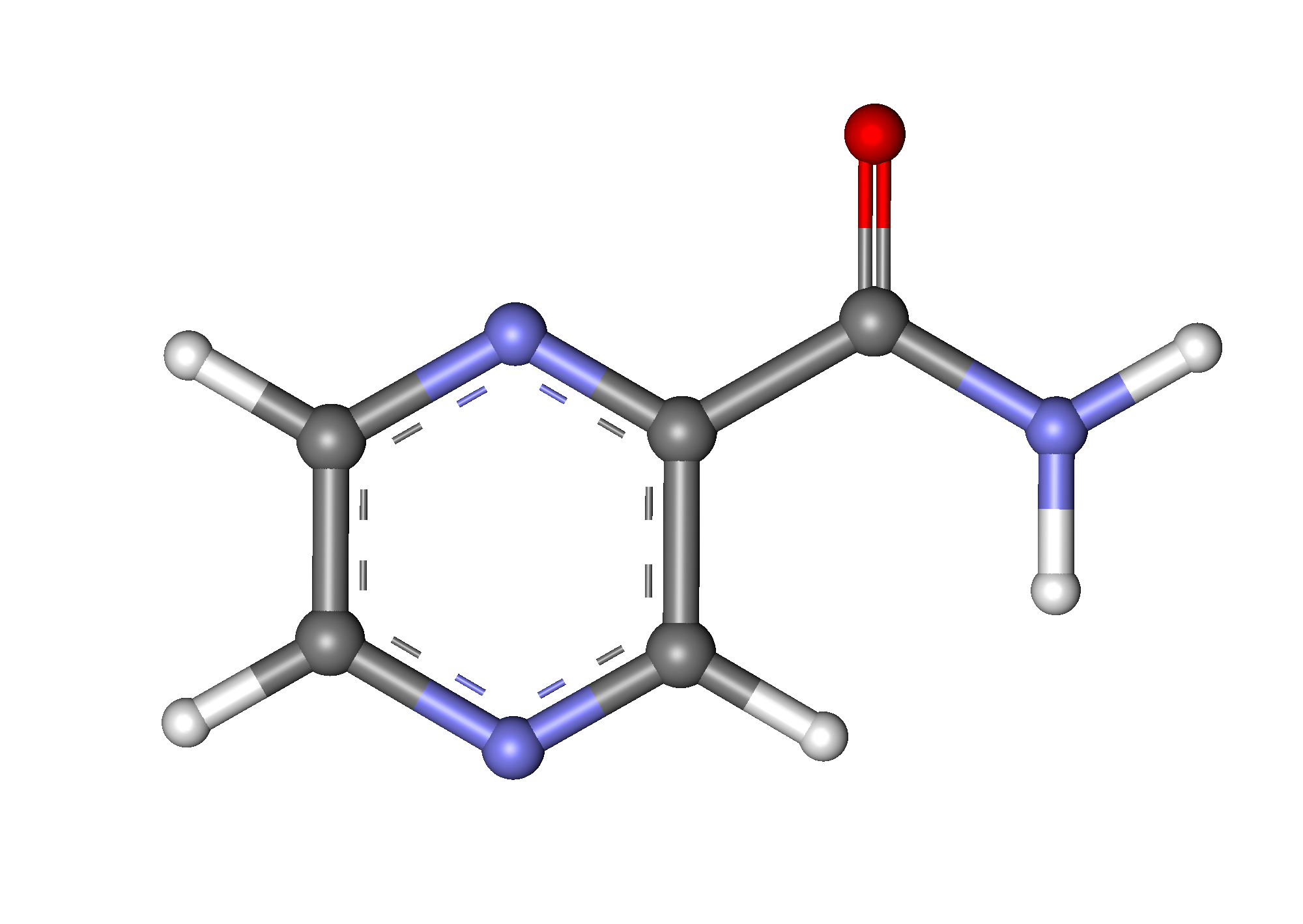

Clinical data
- Trade names: Rifater, Tebrazid, others
- AHFS/Drugs.com: Monograph
- MedlinePlus: a682402
- License data: US DailyMed: Pyrazinamide
- Routes of administration: By mouth
- ATC code: J04AK01 (WHO) J04AM09 (WHO), J04AM10 (WHO), J04AM11 (WHO), J04AM12 (WHO)

Legal status
- Legal status: US: ℞-only; In general: ℞ (Prescription only)

Pharmacokinetic data
- Bioavailability: >90%
- Metabolism: Liver
- Elimination half-life: 9 to 10 hours
- Excretion: Kidney

Identifiers
- IUPAC name: pyrazine-2-carboxamide
- CAS Number: 98-96-4
- PubChem CID: 1046
- IUPHAR/BPS: 7287
- DrugBank: DB00339
- ChemSpider: 1017
- UNII: 2KNI5N06TI
- KEGG: D00144
- ChEBI: CHEBI:45285
- ChEMBL: ChEMBL614
- NIAID ChemDB: 007697
- CompTox Dashboard (EPA): DTXSID9021215
- ECHA InfoCard: 100.002.470

Chemical and physical data
- Formula: C_{5}H_{5}N_{3}O
- Molar mass: 123.115 g·mol^{−1}
- 3D model (JSmol): Interactive image
- SMILES: O=C(N)c1nccnc1
- InChI: InChI=1S/C5H5N3O/c6-5(9)4-3-7-1-2-8-4/h1-3H,(H2,6,9); Key:IPEHBUMCGVEMRF-UHFFFAOYSA-N

Pyrazinamide is a medication used to treat tuberculosis. For active tuberculosis, it is often used with rifampicin, isoniazid, and either streptomycin or ethambutol. It is not generally recommended for the treatment of latent tuberculosis. It is taken by mouth.

Common side effects include nausea, loss of appetite, muscle and joint pains, and rash. More serious side effects include gout, liver toxicity, and sensitivity to sunlight. It is not recommended in those with significant liver disease or porphyria. It is unclear if use during pregnancy is safe but it is likely okay during breastfeeding. Pyrazinamide is in the antimycobacterial class of medications. How it works is not entirely clear.

Pyrazinamide was first made in 1936, but did not come into wide use until 1972. It is on the World Health Organization's List of Essential Medicines. Pyrazinamide is available as a generic medication.

== Medical uses ==
Pyrazinamide is only used in combination with other drugs such as isoniazid and rifampicin in the treatment of Mycobacterium tuberculosis and as directly observed therapy (DOT). It is never used on its own. It has no other indicated medical uses. In particular, it is not used to treat other mycobacteria; Mycobacterium bovis and Mycobacterium leprae are innately resistant to pyrazinamide.

Pyrazinamide is used in the first 2 months of treatment to reduce the duration of treatment required, increasing the bactericidal activity of rifampin-containing regimens. Regimens not containing pyrazinamide must be taken for 9 months or more.

Pyrazinamide is a potent antiuricosuric drug and consequently has an off-label use in the diagnosis of causes of hypouricemia and hyperuricosuria. It acts on URAT1.

== Adverse effects ==
The most common (roughly 1%) side effect of pyrazinamide is joint pains (arthralgia), but this is not usually so severe that patients need to stop taking it. Pyrazinamide can precipitate gout flares by decreasing renal excretion of uric acid.

The most dangerous side effect of pyrazinamide is hepatotoxicity, which is dose-related. The old dose for pyrazinamide was 40–70 mg/kg daily and the incidence of drug-induced hepatitis has fallen significantly since the recommended dose has been reduced to 12–30 mg/kg daily. In the standard four-drug regimen (isoniazid, rifampicin, pyrazinamide, ethambutol), pyrazinamide is the most common cause of drug-induced hepatitis. It is not possible to clinically distinguish pyrazinamide-induced hepatitis from hepatitis caused by isoniazid or rifampicin; test dosing is required (this is discussed in detail in tuberculosis treatment)

Other side effects include nausea and vomiting, anorexia, sideroblastic anemia, skin rash, urticaria, pruritus, dysuria, interstitial nephritis, malaise, rarely porphyria, and fever.

== Pharmacokinetics ==
Pyrazinamide is well absorbed orally. It crosses inflamed meninges and is an essential part of the treatment of tuberculous meningitis. It is metabolised by the liver and the metabolic products are excreted by the kidneys.

Pyrazinamide is routinely used in pregnancy in the UK and the rest of the world; the World Health Organization (WHO) recommends its use in pregnancy; and extensive clinical experience shows that it is safe. In the US, pyrazinamide is not used in pregnancy, citing insufficient evidence of safety. Pyrazinamide is removed by haemodialysis, so doses should always be given at the end of a dialysis session.

== Mechanism of action ==
Pyrazinamide is a prodrug that stops the growth of M. tuberculosis.

Pyrazinamide diffuses into the granuloma of M. tuberculosis, where the tuberculosis enzyme pyrazinamidase converts pyrazinamide to the active form pyrazinoic acid. Under acidic conditions of pH 5 to 6, the pyrazinoic acid that slowly leaks out converts to the protonated conjugate acid, which is thought to diffuse easily back into the bacilli and accumulate. The net effect is that more pyrazinoic acid accumulates inside the bacillus at acid pH than at neutral pH.

Pyrazinoic acid was thought to inhibit the enzyme fatty acid synthase (FAS) I, which is required by the bacterium to synthesize fatty acids although this has been discounted. The accumulation of pyrazinoic acid was also suggested to disrupt membrane potential and interfere with energy production, necessary for survival of M. tuberculosis at an acidic site of infection. However, since an acidic environment is not essential for pyrazinamide susceptibility and pyrazinamide treatment does not lead to intrabacterial acidification nor rapid disruption of membrane potential, this model has also been discounted. Pyrazinoic acid was proposed to bind to the ribosomal protein S1 (RpsA) and inhibit trans-translation, but more detailed experiments have shown that it does not have this activity.

The current hypothesis is that pyrazinoic acid blocks synthesis of coenzyme A. Pyrazinoic acid binds weakly to the aspartate decarboxylase PanD, triggering its degradation. This is an unusual mechanism of action in that pyrazinamide does not directly block the action of its target, but indirectly triggers its destruction.

=== Resistance ===
==== pncA ====
Mutations in the pncA gene of M. tuberculosis, which encodes a pyrazinamidase and converts pyrazinamide to its active form pyrazinoic acid, are responsible for the majority of pyrazinamide resistance in M. tuberculosis strains. Currently, three main methods of testing are used for pyrazinamide resistance: 1) phenotypic tests where a tuberculosis strain is grown in the presence of increasing concentrations of pyrazinamide, 2) measuring levels of pyrazinamidase enzyme produced by the tuberculosis strain, or 3) looking for mutations in the pncA gene of tuberculosis. Concerns exist that the most widely used method for phenotypic resistance testing may overestimate the number of resistant strains.

Global resistance of tuberculosis to pyrazinamide has been estimated to be in 16% of all cases, and 60% of people with multidrug-resistant tuberculosis.

M. bovis is innately resistant due to a H57D difference in pncA (when compared to the version of M. tuberculosis).

==== Other genes ====
A few pyrazinamide-resistant strains with mutations in the rpsA gene have also been identified. However, a direct association between these rpsA mutations and pyrazinamide resistance has not been established. The pyrazinamide-resistant M. tuberculosis strain DHMH444, which harbors a mutation in the carboxy terminal coding region of rpsA, is fully susceptible to pyrazinoic acid and pyrazinamide resistance of this strain was previously associated with decreased pyrazinamidase activity. Further, this strain was found to be susceptible to pyrazinamide in a mouse model of tuberculosis. Thus, current data indicate that rpsA mutations are not likely to be associated with pyrazinamide resistance.

A few pyrazinamide-resistant strains carry the wild type pncA, suggesting that additional genes are implicated. A 2017 analysis of 68 Chilean clinical isolates found that statistically significant variations were found in metal transporters, efflux pumps, and some additional genes. In addition, a 2013 Chinese study have also found that panD mutations are found in resistant strains with wild-type pncA and rpsA.

== Abbreviations ==
The abbreviations PZA and Z are standard, and used commonly in the medical literature, although best practice discourages the abbreviating of drug names to prevent mistakes.

== Presentation ==
Pyrazinamide is a generic drug, and is available in a wide variety of presentations. Pyrazinamide tablets form the bulkiest part of the standard tuberculosis treatment regimen. Pyrazinamide tablets are so large, some people find them impossible to swallow: pyrazinamide syrup is an option.

Pyrazinamide is also available as part of fixed-dose combinations with other TB drugs such as isoniazid and rifampicin (Rifater is an example).

== History ==
Pyrazinamide was first discovered and patented in 1936, but not used against tuberculosis until 1952. Its discovery as an antitubercular agent was remarkable since it has no activity against tuberculosis in vitro, due to not being active at a neutral pH, so would ordinarily not be expected to work in vivo. However, nicotinamide was known to have activity against tuberculosis and pyrazinamide was thought to have a similar effect. Experiments in mice at Lederle and Merck confirmed its ability to kill tuberculosis and it was rapidly used in humans.
