= Enviomycin =

Chemical compound

Clinical data
- AHFS/Drugs.com: International Drug Names
- Routes of administration: IM
- ATC code: J04AB06 (WHO)

Legal status
- Legal status: In general: ℞ (Prescription only)

Identifiers
- IUPAC name: 3,6-diamino-N-[(3R,6Z)-3-(2-amino-3,4,5,6-tetrahydropyrimidin-4-yl)-6-[(carbamoylamino)methylidene]-9,12-bis(hydroxymethyl)-2,5,8,11,14-pentaoxo-1,4,7,10,13-pentazacyclohexadec-15-yl]-4-hydroxyhexanamide
- CAS Number: 33103-22-9
- PubChem CID: 3032903
- DrugBank: DB08993
- ChemSpider: 16736480
- UNII: XU299C23A2
- KEGG: D07897
- ChEMBL: ChEMBL2146142
- CompTox Dashboard (EPA): DTXSID901027569

Chemical and physical data
- Formula: C_{25}H_{43}N_{13}O_{10}
- Molar mass: 685.700 g·mol^{−1}
- 3D model (JSmol): Interactive image
- SMILES: C1CN=C(NC1C2C(=O)NCC(C(=O)NC(C(=O)NC(C(=O)NC(=CNC(=O)N)C(=O)N2)CO)CO)NC(=O)CC(C(CCN)O)N)N
- InChI: InChI=1S/C25H43N13O10/c26-3-1-16(41)10(27)5-17(42)33-12-6-31-23(47)18(11-2-4-30-24(28)37-11)38-20(44)13(7-32-25(29)48)34-21(45)14(8-39)36-22(46)15(9-40)35-19(12)43/h7,10-12,14-16,18,39-41H,1-6,8-9,26-27H2,(H,31,47)(H,33,42)(H,34,45)(H,35,43)(H,36,46)(H,38,44)(H3,28,30,37)(H3,29,32,48)/b13-7-/t10-,11-,12+,14+,15+,16-,18+/m1/s1; Key:HPWIIERXAFODPP-GHBBWTPBSA-N

Enviomycin (INN, also called tuberactinomycin N) is an antibiotic drug, isolated from Streptomyces griseoverticillatus var. tuberacticus. It is used in the treatment of tuberculosis.
