= Isoniazid =

Antibiotic for treatment of tuberculosis

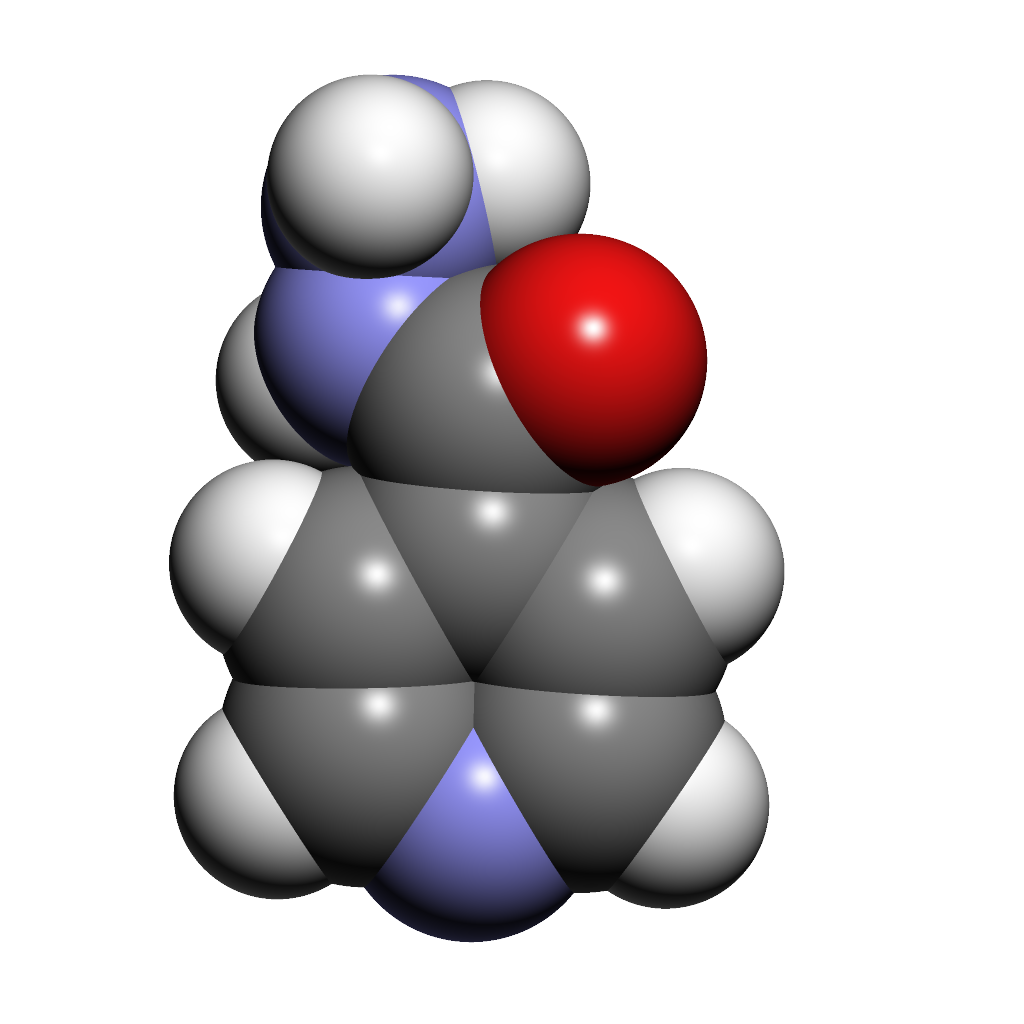

Clinical data
- Trade names: Hydra, Hyzyd, Isovit, others
- Other names: isonicotinic acid hydrazide, isonicotinyl hydrazine, INH, INAH, INHA
- AHFS/Drugs.com: Monograph
- MedlinePlus: a682401
- License data: US DailyMed: Isoniazid
- Pregnancy category: AU: A
- Routes of administration: By mouth, intramuscular, intravenous
- ATC code: J04AC01 (WHO) J04AC51 (WHO), J04AM01 (WHO), J04AM02 (WHO), J04AM03 (WHO), J04AM04 (WHO), J04AM05 (WHO), J04AM06 (WHO), J04AM07 (WHO), J04AM08 (WHO), J04AM09 (WHO), J04AM12 (WHO)

Legal status
- Legal status: CA: ℞-only; US: ℞-only

Pharmacokinetic data
- Protein binding: Very low (0–10%)
- Metabolism: liver; CYP450: 2C19, 3A4 inhibitor
- Elimination half-life: 0.5–1.6h (fast acetylators), 2-5h (slow acetylators)
- Excretion: urine (primarily), feces

Identifiers
- IUPAC name: Pyridine-4-carbohydrazide
- CAS Number: 54-85-3
- PubChem CID: 3767
- DrugBank: DB00951
- ChemSpider: 3635
- UNII: V83O1VOZ8L
- KEGG: D00346; C07054
- ChEBI: CHEBI:6030
- ChEMBL: ChEMBL64
- NIAID ChemDB: 007657
- CompTox Dashboard (EPA): DTXSID8020755
- ECHA InfoCard: 100.000.195

Chemical and physical data
- Formula: C_{6}H_{7}N_{3}O
- Molar mass: 137.142 g·mol^{−1}
- 3D model (JSmol): Interactive image
- SMILES: C1=CN=CC=C1C(=O)NN
- InChI: InChI=1S/C6H7N3O/c7-9-6(10)5-1-3-8-4-2-5/h1-4H,7H2,(H,9,10); Key:QRXWMOHMRWLFEY-UHFFFAOYSA-N

Isoniazid, also known as isonicotinic acid hydrazide (INH), is an antibiotic used for the treatment of tuberculosis. For active tuberculosis, it is often used together with rifampicin, pyrazinamide, and either streptomycin or ethambutol. It may also be used for atypical types of mycobacteria, such as M. avium, M. kansasii, and M. xenopi. It is usually taken by mouth, but may be used by injection into muscle.

Isoniazid is a prodrug that, when activated by catalase-peroxidase KatG, generates adducts and radicals that inhibit the formation of the mycobacterial cell wall. Side effects in those treated with isoniazid include vitamin B6 deficiency, liver toxicity, peripheral neuropathy, and a reduction in blood cell production. Mutations in the ahpC, inhA, kasA, katG, genes of M. tuberculosis may result in isoniazid resistance.

Although first synthesized in 1912, the anti-tuberculosis activity of isoniazid was not discovered until the 1940s. It is on the World Health Organization's List of Essential Medicines and is available as a generic medication.

== Medical uses ==
=== Tuberculosis ===
The primary use of isoniazid is as first-line treatment for latent and active infection of Mycobacterium tuberculosis, the causative agent of tuberculosis (TB). In persons with isoniazid-resistant Mycobacterium tuberculosis infection, drug regimens based on isoniazid have a high rate of failure.

In the United States, the indications for isoniazid use approved by the U.S. Food and Drug Administration (FDA) include:.

- Both active and latent TB
- Intravenous drug users with Mantoux test above 10 mm
- HIV-positive people with Mantoux test above 5 mm
- Those who had close contact with TB patient and have Mantoux test above 5 mm
- As a preventative measure for those with pulmonary silicosis or fibrotic pulmonary lesions from recovered TB

Isoniazid can be used alone or in combination with Rifampin for treatment of latent tuberculosis, or as part of a four-drug regimen.. The drug regimen typically requires daily or weekly oral administration for a period of three to nine months, often under Directly Observed Therapy (DOT) supervision.

=== Non-tuberculous mycobacteria ===
Isoniazid may also be used off-label to treat nontuberculous mycobacterial pulmonary disease. Isoniazid was widely used in the treatment of Mycobacterium avium complex as part of a regimen including rifampicin and ethambutol. Evidence suggests that isoniazid prevents mycolic acid synthesis in M. avium complex as in M. tuberculosis and although this is not bactericidal to M. avium complex, it greatly potentiates the effect of rifampicin.

=== Special populations ===
It is recommended that women with active tuberculosis who are pregnant or breastfeeding take isoniazid. Preventive therapy should be delayed until after giving birth. Nursing mothers excrete a relatively low and non-toxic concentration of INH in breast milk, and their babies are at low risk for side effects. Both pregnant women and infants being breastfed by mothers taking INH should take vitamin B6 in its pyridoxine form to minimize the risk of peripheral nerve damage. Vitamin B6 is used to prevent isoniazid-induced B6 deficiency and neuropathy in people with a risk factor, such as pregnancy, lactation, HIV infection, alcoholism, diabetes, kidney failure, or malnutrition.

People with liver dysfunction are at a higher risk for hepatitis caused by INH, and may need a lower dose. Levels of liver enzymes in the bloodstream should be frequently checked in daily alcohol drinkers, pregnant women, IV drug users, people over 35, and those who have chronic liver disease, severe kidney dysfunction, peripheral neuropathy, or HIV infection since they are more likely to develop hepatitis from INH.

== History ==
=== Synthesis ===
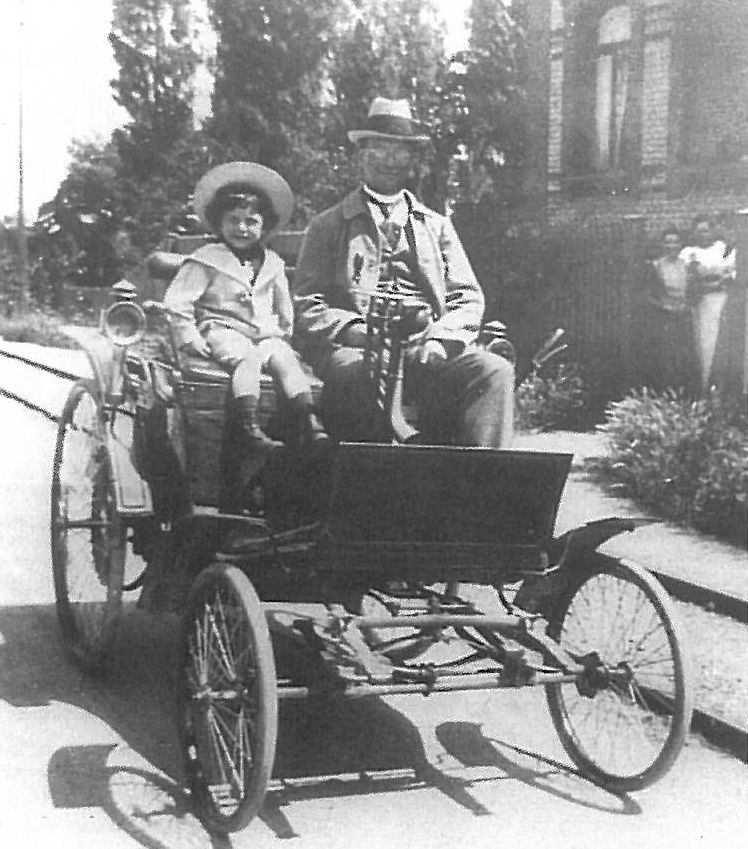
Friedrich Raschig's (right) development of the Olin Raschig process enabled the synthesis of isoniazid in 1912.

After Friedrich Raschig developed a method to synthesize hydrazine, Hans Meyer and his doctoral student at the German University in Prague Josef Mally researched hydrazides of pyridinecarboxylic acids. By reacting ethyl isonicotinate with hydrazine hydrate, they obtained a compound which, after recrystallization, possessed a melting point of 163°C. Despite its publication in 1912, the compound's pharmaceutical properties were not investigated for decades.

In the 1940s, French physicians discovered that nicotinamide had some activity against tubercle bacilli in vitro and in infected guinea pigs. At the same time, German chemists led by G. Domagk investigating sulfo drugs at Bayer developed thioacetazone. After their findings were made public, in 1950 A. Girard modified it to the less toxic thiosemicarbazone of nicotinaldehyde while H. H. Fox developed similar isonicotinaldehyde thiosemicarbazone.

=== Discovery of anti-TB activity ===
Soon, multiple laboratories discovered anti-TB activity of isoniazid. This led three pharmaceutical companies to unsuccessfully attempt to patent the drug at the same time, the most prominent one being Roche in January 1951, which launched its version, Rimifon, in 1952. Additionally, Soviet physicians A. Kachugin and Bella Keyfman independently discovered this activity in 1949, but neither published their findings in a peer-reviewed article nor applied for an inventor's certificate.

The drug was first tested at Many Farms, a Navajo community in Arizona, due to the Navajo reservation's tuberculosis problem and because the population had not previously been treated with streptomycin, the main tuberculosis treatment at the time. The research was led by Walsh McDermott, an infectious disease researcher with an interest in public health, who had previously taken isoniazid to treat his own tuberculosis.

Isoniazid and a related drug, iproniazid, were among the first drugs to be referred to as antidepressants. Psychiatric use stopped in 1961 following reports of hepatotoxicity. Use against tuberculosis continued, as isoniazid's effectiveness against the disease outweighs its risks.

=== Elucidation of mechanism of action ===
Seminal studies that uncovered the mechanism of action for isoniazid were largely performed in M. smegmatis, a model for the slow-growing M. tuberculosis. In 1992, Stewart Cole and colleagues discovered that isoniazid was active in resistant M. smegmatis only when KatG, a catalase-peroxidase, was expressed; KatG is now understood to be critical for the metabolism of the prodrug isoniazid into its active forms..

At the Albert Einstein College of Medicine, William R. Jacobs Jr. and coworkers discovered that inhA—which they also found to encode an NADH-specific enoyl-acyl carrier protein reductase—as isoniazid's primary target The isoniazid-NAD adduct was also shown to bind and inhibit InhA, the protein product of inhA.

=== Modern usage ===
As part of standard TB chemotherapy, isoniazid is now typically administered alongside at least three other drugs—ethambutol, pyrazinamide, and rifampin—for six to nine months.

Isoniazid is also included on the World Health Organization's List of Essential Medicines. The World Health Organization classifies isoniazid as critically important for human medicine.

== Adverse effects ==
=== Side effects ===
Due to structural similarities, isoniazid administration can cause vitamin B6 deficiency via reduced activation and increased excretion.

Up to 20% of people taking isoniazid experience peripheral neuropathy when taking daily doses of 6 mg/kg of body weight or higher. Gastrointestinal reactions include nausea and vomiting. Aplastic anemia, thrombocytopenia, and agranulocytosis due to lack of production of red blood cells, platelets, and white blood cells by the bone marrow respectively, can also occur. Hypersensitivity reactions are common and can present with a maculopapular rash and fever. Gynecomastia may also occur.

Isoniazid inhibits pyridoxine phosphokinase, which is responsible for maintaining the active form of vitamin B6, pyridoxal 5′-phosphate (P5P). Isoniazid is also associated with increased excretion of pyridoxine. Altogether, this means that isoniazid can cause pyridoxine (vitamin B6) deficiency, leading to peripheral neuropathy and (rarely) sideroblastic anemia via insufficient P5P provided to δ-aminolevulinic acid synthase. It is recommended that isoniazid be taken with pyridoxine in persons at risk of peripheral neuropathy as well as those who have already developed peripheral neuropathy.

Asymptomatic elevation of serum liver enzyme concentrations occurs in 10% to 20% of people taking INH, and liver enzyme concentrations usually return to normal even when treatment is continued. Isoniazid has a boxed warning for severe and sometimes fatal hepatitis, which is age-dependent at a rate of 0.3% in people 21 to 35 years old and over 2% in those over age 50. Symptoms suggestive of liver toxicity include nausea, vomiting, abdominal pain, dark urine, right upper quadrant pain, and loss of appetite. Black and Hispanic women are at higher risk for isoniazid-induced hepatotoxicity. When it happens, isoniazid-induced liver toxicity has been shown to occur in 50% of patients within the first 2 months of therapy.

Some recommend that liver function should be monitored carefully in all people receiving it, but others recommend monitoring only in certain populations. Headache, poor concentration, weight gain, poor memory, insomnia, and depression have all been associated with isoniazid use. All patients and healthcare workers should be aware of these serious side effects, especially if suicidal ideation or behavior are suspected.

=== Drug interactions ===
Isoniazid decreases the metabolism of carbamazepine, slowing down its clearance from the body. People taking carbamazepine should have their carbamazepine levels monitored and, if necessary, have their dose adjusted accordingly. Isoniazid can also increase the amount of phenytoin in the body. The doses of phenytoin may need to be adjusted when given with isoniazid. Isoniazid may increase the plasma levels of theophylline. There are some cases of theophylline slowing down isoniazid elimination. Both theophylline and isoniazid levels should be monitored. Valproate levels may increase when taken with isoniazid. Valproate levels should be monitored and its dose adjusted if necessary.

People taking isoniazid and acetaminophen are at risk of acetaminophen toxicity. Isoniazid is thought to induce a liver enzyme which causes a larger amount of acetaminophen to be metabolized to a toxic form.

It is possible that isoniazid may decrease the serum levels of ketoconazole after long-term treatment. This is seen with the simultaneous use of rifampin, isoniazid, and ketoconazole.

== Mechanism of action ==
Isoniazid is a prodrug that inhibits the formation of the mycobacterial cell wall. Isoniazid must be activated by KatG, a bacterial catalase-peroxidase enzyme in Mycobacterium tuberculosis. KatG catalyzes the formation of the isonicotinic acyl radical, which spontaneously couples with NADH to form the nicotinoyl-NAD adduct. This complex binds tightly to the enoyl-acyl carrier protein reductase InhA, thereby blocking the natural enoyl-AcpM substrate and the action of fatty acid synthase. This process inhibits the synthesis of mycolic acids, which are required components of the mycobacterial cell wall. A range of radicals are produced by KatG activation of isoniazid, including nitric oxide, which has also been shown to be important in the action of another antimycobacterial prodrug pretomanid.

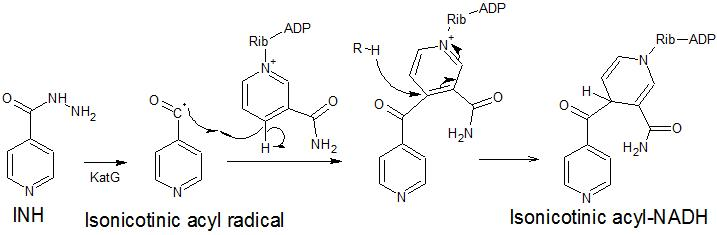

Isoniazid is bactericidal to rapidly dividing mycobacteria, but is bacteriostatic if the mycobacteria are slow-growing. It inhibits the cytochrome P450 system and hence acts as a source of free radicals.

Isoniazid is a mild non-selective monoamine oxidase inhibitor (MAO-I). It inhibits diamine oxidase more strongly. These two actions are possible explanations for its antidepressant action as well as its ability to cause mania.

== Metabolism ==
Isoniazid reaches therapeutic concentrations in serum, cerebrospinal fluid, and within caseous granulomas. It is metabolized in the liver via acetylation into acetylhydrazine. Two forms of the enzyme are responsible for acetylation, so some patients metabolize the drug more quickly than others. Hence, the half-life is bimodal, with "slow acetylators" and "fast acetylators". A graph of number of people versus time shows peaks at one and three hours. The height of the peaks depends on the ethnicities of the people being tested. The metabolites are excreted in the urine. Doses do not usually have to be adjusted in case of renal failure.

== Overdose ==
Isoniazid causes seizure on overdose due to a depletion of pyridoxal 5′-phosphate (P5P) preventing glutamic acid decarboxylase from making gamma aminobutyric acid (GABA). Ordinary pyridoxine is an effective antidote of this mechanism of toxicity.

== Preparation ==
Isoniazid is an isonicotinic acid derivative. It is manufactured using 4-cyanopyridine and hydrazine hydrate. In another method, isoniazid was claimed to have been made from citric acid starting material.

== Brand names ==
Brand names for isoniazid include Hydra, Hyzyd, Isovit, Laniazid, Nydrazid, Rimifon, and Stanozide.

== Other uses ==
=== Chromatography ===
Isonicotinic acid hydrazide is also used in chromatography to differentiate between various degrees of conjugation in organic compounds barring the ketone functional group.
