= Adeola Akinremi =

Nigerian journalist

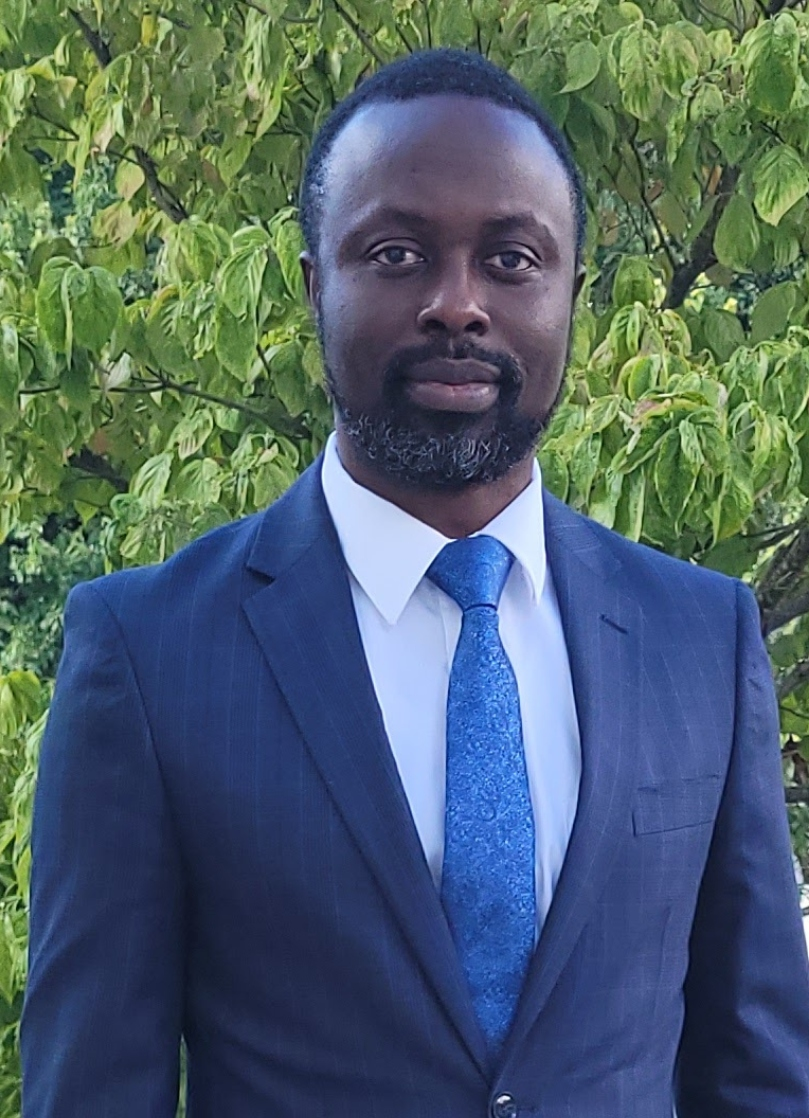
- Adeola Akinremi in portrait in 2023
- Education: Johns Hopkins University-SAIS
- Occupations: Policy & Economic Development
- Known for: Exposing the Muhammadu Buhari's plagiarism scandal
- Notable work: Scattered Ground
- Website: www.adeolaakinremi.com

Adeola Akinremi is a Nigerian-born author, international development expert, and economic policy strategist. His work in international development bridges economic development, governance reform, private sector development, public sector transformation, climate policy, regulatory reform, strategic communications, and institutional reform, partnering with governments, multilateral organizations, philanthropic institutions, and civil society networks to advance sustainable development outcomes.

Across his engagements in international development and public policy, Akinremi led a global campaign for a major United Nations treaty, the WHO-FCTC ratification and implementation in Africa.

Known for his practitioner-level analyses of global political and economic trends, Akinremi worked as a journalist, editor, and columnist at THISDAY, covering public policy, governance, globalization, and international affairs. On 16 September 2016, he broke a plagiarism story, in which Nigeria’s former President Muhammadu Buhari copied from President Barack Obama and passing it off as if it was his own.

In an article he penned for This Day, Akinremi exposed the Nigerian leader for plagiarizing President Barack Obama’s 2008 victory speech on a day he launched an ethical rebirth campaign for his country—Change begins with me. The scandal led to a global outrage and apology made by President Buhari who angrily fired the aide who penned the speech.

== Education ==
Akinremi received his Master's degree in Public Policy from Johns Hopkins University's School of Advanced International Studies and additional Master's degree in Project Development and Implementation from the University of Ibadan in Nigeria. He graduated from journalism school in 1999. He holds a Bachelor of Arts degree in International Relations from the Lagos State University.

== Professional career ==
In International development, he has worked on climate change, food security, global health, and poverty reduction initiatives while working for the World Bank Group, Environmental Rights Action and the Framework Convention Alliance (FCA). He mobilized the civil society groups and government leaders in Africa to work together for the ratification and implementation campaign of the World Health Organization’s Framework Convention on Tobacco Control (FCTC) - one of the most quickly ratified treaties in United Nations history - when he provided leadership for the overall strategy of the Framework Convention Alliance (FCA) in Africa.

Akinremi is known to be closer to the Nigerian banker and billionaire, Tony Elumelu, and has written extensively about his life, wealth, philosophy and philanthropy.

== Awards and recognitions ==
- 2014: Nigeria Media Merit Awards, (NMMA), "Newspaper Reporter of the Year"
- 2006: Nigeria Media Merit Awards (NMMA), "Features Writer of the Year"
- 2006: Diamond Awards for Media Excellence (DAME), "Health Reporter of the Year
- 2008: The Future Awards, Nigeria, "Nominated for Best Use of Advocacy"
- 2004: Inaugural Winner, Nigeria Youth Leadership Awards by LEAP Africa.
