= John Grange =

John Grange may refer to:

- John Thomas Grange (1837–1924), Canadian businessman
- John Grange (immunologist) (born 1943), English physician, immunologist and epidemiologist
- John Grange (Kansas politician), American Republican
