= Hemant Goswami =

Indian social activist

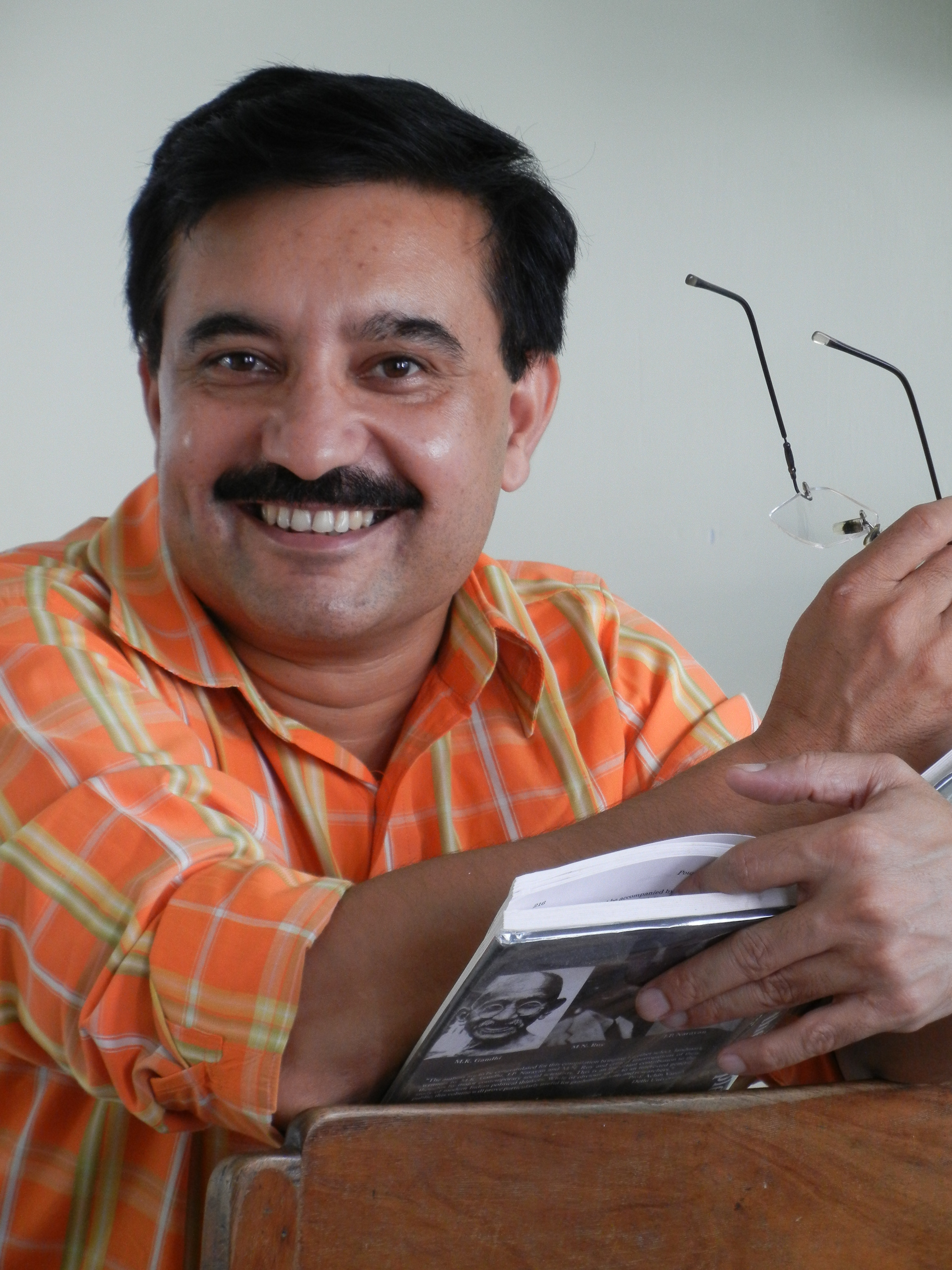
- Hemant Goswami
- Born: 1971 (age 54–55); Delhi, India
- Organisation(s): Burning Brain Society; Citizens' Voice; Tobacco Free World Foundation; Resurgence India; Servants of the People Society
- Movement: Child Rights; Right to Information; Public Health & Tobacco Control; Civil Rights; Right to Education; Environment; Agriculture Reforms; Judicial Reforms
- Awards: Global Smoke-Free Partnership Award; Young Leadership Award; WHO Award for Public Health and Tobacco Control; Youth Health Champion Award

Hemant Goswami (born 1971) is an Indian social activist working on social issues like public health, environmental activism, child rights, child labour and many other civil right issues. He is also well known as a voice against tobacco. He is credited with creating the first smoke-free city in any Third World country with the effective use of the Right to Information Act. He was awarded the "Global Smoke-Free Partnership Award" in 2008 and also THE "Extraordinary Activist Award" for the innovative use of legal action and activism resulting in the smoke-free Chandigarh initiative. Hemant Goswami is the great-grandson of Swami Rama Tirtha the 19th-century spiritual leader and social reformer. Hemant is the founder of many NGO's including Burning Brain Society, Tobacco Free India Coalition and Citizens' Voice which were till recently managed by him from Chandigarh. Hemant has also been closely associated with Servants of the People Society too and till 2013 also worked as the Chief Executive officer (CEO) of The Samaja, one of the largest-selling Oriya daily newspaper founded by Gopabandhu Das in 1919.

== Biography ==
Hemant Goswami was born in Delhi on 30 June 1971 to an Indian Air Force officer and a teacher. With initial formal education in electronic sciences, Hemant subsequently moved to management. He holds multiple post-graduation qualifications in diverse streams, including Business Management, Journalism and Mass Communication, Health Sociology, Intellectual Property Laws, Information Technology and Industrial Psychology. Though Hemant started his career as a marketing professional but later-on got professionally engaged as an IT professional, management consultant and a trainer. After working for a few years on the board of directors of many companies/organisations, Hemant left his other professional assignments in 2001 to work full-time as a social activist with major focus on fighting corruption, judicial reforms and ensuring transparency. He strongly believes that problems and anomalies in these areas of governance is the main reason for the abuse of civil rights of the people. Tobacco control and countering substance use disorders are other major areas of his work in public health. During his college days (in the early 1990s), he founded the Society for Prevention of Crime and Corruption, an NGO to work on corruption issues. In 2001, he founded the Burning Brain Society and in 2004 formed Citizens' Voice. A documentary film entitled Change Catalyst was released in 2011 to document the work done by Hemant Goswami in creating Chandigarh as India's first smoke-free city.

=== Anti-corruption crusade ===
Hemant Goswami is known for being an independent voice in challenging corruption and ensuring accountability in public service and governance at the highest echelons. The infamous Red Cross Scam, the 83 Crores Agro-diversification scam, the relief fund misutilization, and many other such like expose against corruption have been brought to light by his group as a part of 'Mission Zero Tolerance' initiative of Resurgence India. Hemant also exposed the infamous sports equipment purchase scam, the Chandigarh theme-park and film-city scams. Based on his independent investigations and complaint the CBI subsequently registered a criminal case. Hemant also exposed the 'Teacher Recruitment Scam' in Chandigarh and recently (In 2012) the High Court of Punjab and Haryana has ordered the CBI-Delhi to directly investigate the scam. Hemant Goswami also effectively uses judicial activism for getting results in matters of public importance through the use of Public Interest Litigation. While his work on tobacco control and right to information has been widely recognised and won him numerous awards, his fearless fight against narcotics and drug mafia and their nexus with the police has won him much public appreciation. In one of his daring acts, while arguing a public interest petition himself, in-person, Hemant produced packs of drugs in the open High Court before the Chief Justice to expose the easy availability of Drugs.

=== Action against tobacco ===
Hemant's fight against tobacco has continued since his school days. Continuing his strong actions against tobacco has produced encouraging results. Remarkable among the results is churning the city-state of Chandigarh as the first city-state in the emerging world to be smoke-free. The success of smoke-free Chandigarh has been made into a documentary film entitled Change Catalyst – Creating Smoke-Free Cities. The innovative strategies used by Hemant and the success story of 'Smoke-Free Chandigarh' has also been used by WHO to develop an international best practice guidebook on making cities smokefree. Hemant was also the lead author and investigator of the WHO and Ministry of Health (India) research study on 'Tobacco in Movies and its Impact on Youngsters.' This study by Hemant Goswami is used by the Government of India to justify the 2005 enacted delegated legislation prohibiting the use of tobacco in movies. Fighting numerous legal battles on tobacco control has also produced good results for Hemant. Such legal initiative includes; filing of hundreds of complaint cases against street vending of tobacco, legal action against the Government for inaction on 'Steering Committee' formed to take care of tobacco advertisements, and even challenging one of the major tobacco companies in India to force them to discontinue the use of trade-name of their cigarette brand from (surrogate) promotion activities by wrongly associating it with bravery awards. Bollywood stars like Sanjay Dutt, Salman Khan and Ajay Devgan have also suffered the wrath of Goswami for smoking in public-places and had to face prosecution and fine on the complaints of Goswami. Besides regular monitoring and reporting about the violations of law by the tobacco industry, Hemant has also exposed the nexus between the tobacco corporates and political parties. He exposed and proved about tobacco company donations to almost each and every political party in the parliament of India. The expose made the political parties sensitive to the issue and resulted in discontinuation of overt funding by the tobacco industry to political parties. Legal fight against the illegal Hookah/Shisha Bars has resulted in closure of illegal tobacco and nicotine supply in the northern region of India. Hemant also sat on a sit-in hunger protest outside the White House, USA in May 2007 against non-ratification of the Framework Convention on Tobacco Control (FCTC) by the US government. Hemant has created an absolutely new style of result-oriented 360-degree activism on tobacco control which has been recognised globally.

=== Action against Nicotine & E-cigarettes ===
Hemant Goswami led a 12 years long battle to ban Nicotine containing articles, including E-Cigarettes. As a result of his efforts the Union government’s enacted a legislation on E-Cigarette in 2019. In 2007, a social activist from Chandigarh, Hemant Goswami filed a Public Interest Writ Petition (CWP 14597 of 2007) in Punjab and Haryana High Court demanding banning all forms of chemical Nicotine, as it was a deadly poison and its various forms like Sheesha/ Hookah, e-cigarettes, etc. were a grave danger to the public. After five years of legal fight, in 2012, the High Court finally passed its judgement admitting that Nicotine and all Nicotine delivery devices were poisons and the State must regulate the same. Thereafter, the States of Punjab, Haryana & Chandigarh added Nicotine in the list of Poison under the Poisons Act of 1919. The High Court also asked the States to constitute a permanent task force for monitoring the use of nicotine. The high court kept the writ alive, to date, for monitoring purposes. Subsequent to the High Court order, in 2013 the Ministry of Health formed an expert committee with the petitioner Hemant Goswami and WHO officials as expert members. After deliberations for five years, in 2017, the legal group of the expert committee recommended that "it is necessary and expedient in public interest to completely, without any exception, prohibit the import, manufacturing, distribution and sale of Nicotine as an extract and/or chemical, and Electronic Nicotine Delivery Devices.." The Union government finally enacted a legislation Prohibition of Electronic Cigarettes (Production, Manufacture, Import, Export, Transport, Sale, Distribution, Storage and Advertisement) Act in December 2019.

=== Activism on Right to Information ===
As an activist advocating free speech and fighting for Right to Information (RTI), Hemant's activism has resulted in many tangible results. The smoke-free Chandigarh initiative itself largely succeeded due to innovative use of RTI wherein Hemant filed nearly 300 RTI petition to bring in accountability in action and to set the ball rolling for the implementation of the smoke-free laws. Besides taking tough stands against any proposed amendment to the RTI Act, Goswami has taken senior bureaucrats and Governors too for lack of transparency and accountability in their offices. When the governor-administrator of Chandigarh refused to follow the Right to Information Act, Hemant worked to ensure transparency in the office of the governor-administrator of Chandigarh. After legal battle, favourable orders were secured in July 2008 from the Central Information Commission (CIC) and thereafter the office of the governor-administrator was forced to open its public records for the public and operate in a transparent manner. Subsequent to this, the Administrator-Governor of UT of Chandigarh increased the fee for obtaining information by five folds. Once again Hemant fought the decision and after many public interactions and Writ Petitions in the High Court the decision to increase the fee had to be reversed. Another initiative of Hemant Goswami, as a part of "Mission Zero Tolerance" against corruption, resulted in a consolidated order by the CIC (deciding 52 complaints by "Society for Prevention of Crime and Corruption" in one single order), wherein all Central Government and Chandigarh Administration offices were directed to ensure proper implementation of the Right to Information Act 2005 and thereby directions were issued to the Government to proactively publish all the public documents online on the internet.

=== Creation of first RTI library ===
In June 2012, Hemant Goswami founded Asia's first RTI library which is housed at Dwarka Das Library, Chandigarh. Hemant also developed a new innovative library classification system called "Indian Official Documents Classification System" for indexing and cataloguing government documents.

=== Work on Senior Citizen rights ===
Hemant Goswami also works on Senior Citizen issues and for Maintenance and Welfare of Parents and Senior Citizens Act. In 2017 Goswami filed a civil writ petition 11260/2017 in Delhi High Court against Arvind Kejriwal Delhi government for not implementing the senior citizen legislation. The High court in an order dated 2018 directed the Kejriwal government to widely publicise the legislation and ensure that the senior citizen tribunals function properly and dispose off the cases filed by senior citizens in time.

=== Work on education reforms ===
Hemant actively works on Right to Education (RTE) issues and empowerment of economically deprived children. His firm stand against exploitation of children by the private educational institutions has been criticised by the private schools.

=== Child labour and exploitation ===
Hemant has also moved the courts against the Government for violation of child rights and to stop widespread child labour, his efforts against exploitation of children has forced the government to constitute 'Commission for protection of child rights' in the State of Haryana, Punjab and Chandigarh. On 9 April 2013, the Punjab and Haryana High Court gave landmark order on the writ-petition (PIL CWP 2693 of 2010) moved by Hemant Goswami. The court, accepted all the contentions and suggestions put forward by Hemant (who argued the case in-person) and directed that;

- There shall be total ban on the employment of children up to the age of 14 years, be it hazardous or non-hazardous industries.
- There shall be no forced labour even for children between the age of 14 to 18 years; and whenever a child above the age of 14 years is forced to work, it has to be treated as an offence under Section 374 IPC and it is to be dealt with sternly.
- When any matter is brought to the notice of the State Commission (or for that matter suo motu cognizance taken by the State Commission) involving violation of child rights even where a child above the age of 14-year is employed, the State Commission under the CPCR Act will have the jurisdiction to deal with the same and pass necessary directions.
- The violators have to be dealt with effectively and in a speedy manner. Therefore, wherever violations are found, cases under the provisions of Part-IV of the Child Labour Prohibition Act have to be registered without delay in each and every case.
- Wherever the officers fail or neglect to take effective action immediately, apart from taking necessary disciplinary action, action can also be taken, in appropriate cases, under Section 166 IPC against such officers.
- There is also a need for rehabilitation of such children in the society. (Direction/ scheme suggested by Hemant Goswami was adopted by the Court, with the following main points; (a) Moving out the child from the exploitative environment (b) Ensuring Education (c) Ensuring Food/Meals/Clothes/ Necessities (D) Penalty/Compensation should be for the benefit of the Child (e) Regular Monitoring)
- The Chairperson of "State Commissions for Protection of Child Rights" should be a person who has been Judge of the High Court and the process of selection of the other six members of the "State Commissions for Protection of Child Rights" should entail issuance of public advertisement for inviting applications, interviewing eligible candidates and recommending a panel of names of suitable persons.
- States of Punjab and Haryana as well as U.T., Chandigarh shall also ensure that the State Commissions become fully functional by appointing Chairpersons and Members.
- Children’s Courts with specialised infrastructure be created.

The order is considered a landmark in "Child Rights," as the court declared many existing provisions of the 1986 child labour legislation as illegal and against the Constitution of India.

=== Reforms in Judiciary ===
The method followed for appointment of Judges in the higher judiciary in India has been openly criticised by Hemant, who consider it to be a source of corruption and inefficiency in the higher judiciary. Hemant has also been raising his voice against the unethical conduct of lawyers. In March 2013, lawyers in Chandigarh clashed with some police officials. The High Court decided to take suo-motu notice of the incidence with an objective to absolve the lawyers of any criminal action against them. Hemant opposed the action of the High Court and filed an intervention in the court opposing the quashing of the First Information Report, asserting that law does not bestow special privileges on advocates and that equality before law should prevail. Criticising the action of the High Court, Hemant wrote to the High Court that collective might and power of a group of people who are collectively registered as a separate juristic person should not be allowed to browbeat the system by putting extraneous pressure and by forceful imposition of their collective bargaining power. The issue was further escalated by Hemant taking the matter to public domain wherein he raised questions about neutrality of the High Court in the whole episode.

=== Revival of Sanskrit ===
Hemant Goswami is also working on protecting the cultural roots of India and its languages. In October 2012 Hemant filed a writ petition in the Punjab and Haryana High Court for declaring Sanskrit as a 'Minority' language, so that it could enjoy special protection as available to minorities under the Constitution of India. The High Court directed the Government to consider the contentions of Hemant and decide the matter within two months.

=== Green activism ===
Hemant is also associated with work on Genetically Modified Food and Agriculture reforms and is closely connected with Kheti Virasat Mission. Hemant has been advocating against the grant of patents and intellectual property rights on seeds and any kind of living organisms. He is also actively engaged in fight against unjustified subsidy and concession to big fertilizer and pesticide companies at the cost of poor farmers. Goswami has been working on for policy shift to promote natural and ecologically viable alternatives instead of unnatural farming.

== Awards and recognitions ==
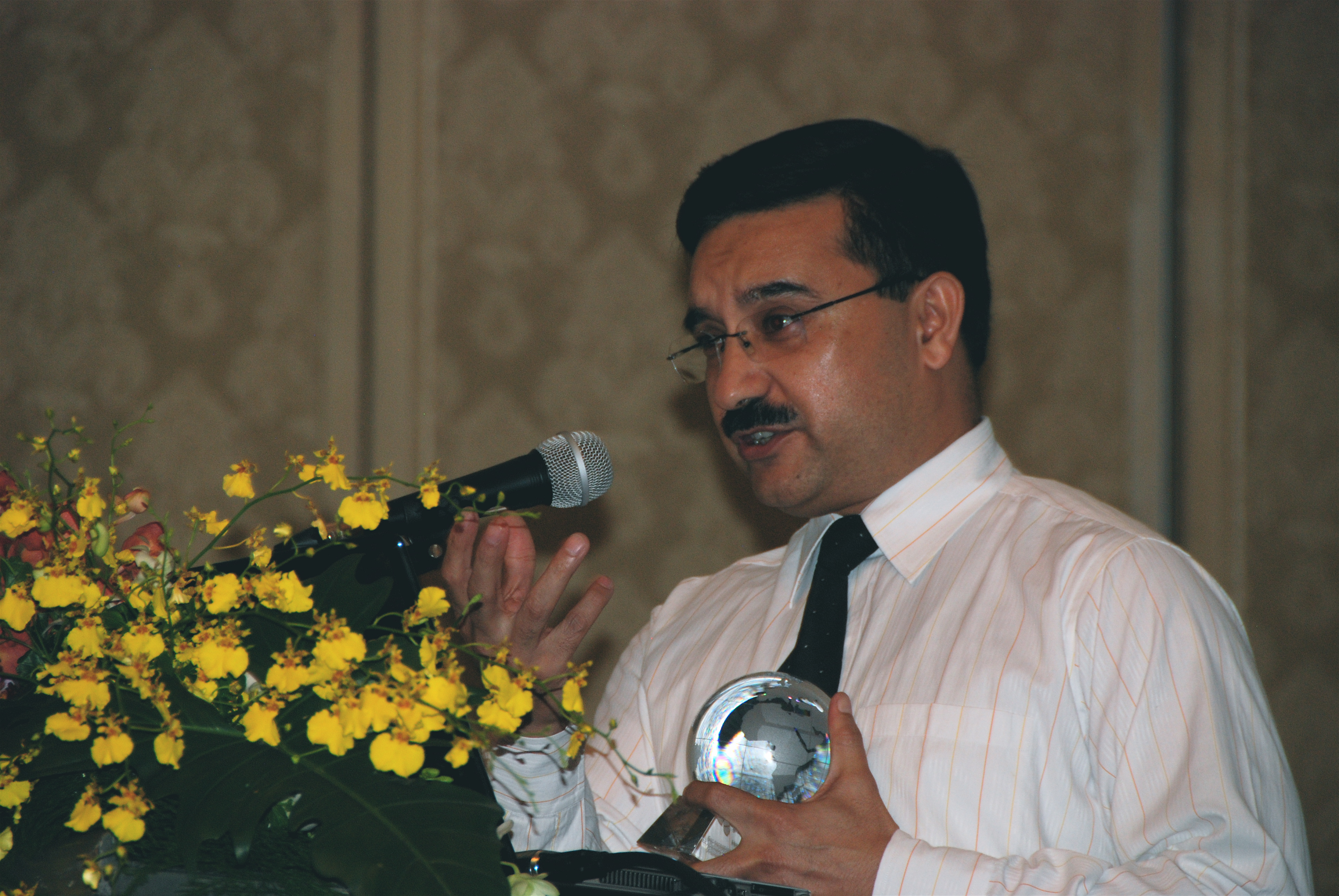
Hemant Goswami after receiving the Global Smoke-Free Partnership Award at Bangkok

A few of the recognitions accorded to Hemant Goswami for his work are;

- WHO Appreciation Award for Tobacco Control - by World Health Organization; 2013
- Global Smoke-Free Partnership Award – by American Cancer Society in Bangkok; 2008
- Young Leadership Award – by APCTH at Taipai; 2007
- Young Scholars Award – by APCTH at Taipai; 2007
- Extraordinary Activist Award (For Legal Initiatives) – by University of Washington at Washington DC; 2008
- Youth Health Champion Award 2014 - by Cancer Institute, etc. Chennai; 2014

== Affiliations and assignments ==
Hemant is affiliated and associated with the following organisations;

- Burning Brain Society – Chairperson
- Servants of the People Society – Assistant Secretary
- Samaja – Chief Executive Officer (CEO)
- World Health Organization (WHO) – Invited Expert
- National Steering Committee on Tobacco Control, Govt. of India – Member
- Inter-Ministerial Task Force on Tobacco Control, Govt. of India – Member
- Chandigarh Tobacco Control Cell, Govt. of UT Chandigarh – Member
- Tobacco Free India Coalition – Founder Convener
- Tobacco Free World Foundation – Director
- Resurgence India – General Secretary
- Citizens' Voice – Chief Executive
- Progressive Development Facilitators P. Ltd. – Director
- Society for Prevention of Crime and Corruption – Chairperson

== Writings ==
Hemant has written four books and many short articles on varied subjects. Not only that it shows his mastery over many subjects and domains but it also reflects the different phases of his life. He authored his first book, "Towards a Perfect Democracy," on his political thoughts and philosophy at the age of 28 years. This book is also credited as the first full-length online book by an Indian author to be launched on the internet. His published books are;

- Towards a Perfect Democracy – 1999
- How to be Successful in Interviews – 2001
- How to Fight Corruption and Live With Dignity – 2003
- The Tobacco Menace – 2005

While working as the CEO of Samaja, Hemant penned the first ever internal "code of Ethics" in India for journalists and developed an internal procedure for newspapers to deal with aberrations while reporting.

== Creative Pursuits ==
The creative talent of Hemant reflected in his paintings during his early days. He won many prizes and recognitions in various regional, national and international awards during his student days. Later on he shifted to digital forms and more recently to amateur film making. Hemant is pursuing film-making mainly to aid his social activism and as a tool of mass communication for social change. Hemant has produced and directed a few documentaries and short films, some of them are;

- Tobacco in Movies and Impact on Youngsters (2005)
- The Lost Track – Sports in India, Dreams Hopes and Reality (2007)
- The Last Song (2008)

== Papers and Scientific Presentations ==
Besides numerous writings, presentations and lectures by Hemant Goswami, here are some of the most recent papers and presentations by him at prominent international forums and conferences;

- Tobacco in Movies and Impact on Youth : Paper (WHO-MoHFW, India study, 2005)
- Tobacco in Movies and Impact on Youth : Presentation (13th World Conference, USA, 2006)
- Promoting Tobacco via "Research," (BMJ, 2006)
- Exploring Strategies for Developing Community Advocacy (Global Health Conference, USA, 2007)
- Associating tobacco with bravery and its impact (13th World Conference, USA, 2006)
- Evaluation of tobacco control legislation in India (13th World Conference, USA, 2006)
- Future Possibilities in Policy and Legislative Measures to Control Tobacco (5th Annual Conference, ISPTID, Hong Kong, 2006)
- Civil Society Monitoring of the Framework Convention on Tobacco Control: 2007 Status Report of the Framework Convention Alliance (Co-Authored – India Report)
- Strategic Activism for Enforcement of Tobacco Control Laws: – A Case Study for Tobacco Control Advocates (8th APACT Conference, Taiwan, 2007)
- Role of Movies in Promoting Favourable Impression of Tobacco among Youngsters (8th APACT Conference, Taiwan, 2007)
- Beyond The FCTC – Future Possibilities on Ending Tobacco (8th APACT Conference, Taiwan, 2007)
- Reduced Ignition Propensity (RIP) Cigarettes – Facts, Fiction and Manipulations (ISPTID, Little Rock, 2007)
- Rural and urban divide in awareness and sensitisation level on AIDS (IAS 2007 – 4th Conference on HIV Pathogenesis and Treatment and Prevention – Sydney, 2007)
- Use of Legal Innovations for Practical Results (5th World Conference, Washington DC, 2008)
- What FCTC Missed Out – The Logical Conclusion (SRNT 2008, Thailand, 2008)
- Enforcement of Tobacco Control Laws – (WHO, Intercountry Workshop on Tobacco Control Legislation, Colombo, 2008)
- Comprehensive tobacco control legislation – defining the key features/characteristics/structures (Intercountry Workshop Colombo, Sri Lanka, 4–5 December 2008)
- Litigation in Tobacco Control; Tobacco Industry Tactics – (WHO, Intercountry Workshop on Tobacco Control Legislation, Colombo, 2008)
- Smoke Free Chandigarh – A Case Study (14th World Conference, 2009)
- Making The Indoor Environment Smoke-Free (14th World Conference, 2009)
- Continued Indirect and Surrogate Promotion by Tobacco Industry – The Wolf in the Lamb Skin (14th World Conference, 2009)
- How subversion of tobacco advertisement bans defeat tobacco control policy objectives (World Conference on Lung Health, Cancun, Mexico, 2009)
- Smoke-free Chandigarh: a case study (World Conference on Lung Health, Cancun, Mexico, 2009)
- Winning Strategies – What works in smoke-free initiative in the emerging world: Learning’s from smoke-free Chandigarh case study (Asia Pacific Conference on Tobacco or Health, October 2010, Sydney, Australia)
