= John Crofton =

Sir John Wenman Crofton (27 March 1912 – 3 November 2009) was a pioneer in the treatment of tuberculosis, who also spent the better part of his life raising awareness about the harmful effects of tobacco.

== Early life and family ==
Crofton was born in Dublin, Ireland to a well-off Anglo-Irish family. His father was physician William Mervyn Crofton, who conducted medical research at the Royal University in Dublin, wrote books on endocrinology and virology, and had flourishing private medical practices both in Dublin and London. His mother was Mary Josephine Abbott, known as Molly. Crofton was sent to prep school at Baymount, in the suburbs of Dublin away from "The Troubles", and then in 1925 to Tonbridge School in Kent.

== Education ==
In 1930 Crofton matriculated at Sidney Sussex College in the University of Cambridge, eventually earning an MB in 1937 and MD in 1947. During his studies he was a keen rock-climber, making frequent expeditions to the Scottish Highlands, and pioneering a number of climbs, one of which (the Cumming-Crofton route on Mitre Ridge in the Cairngorms) still bears his name. Like most Cambridge medical students, his clinical practice was in London, in his case at St Thomas's Hospital. During this time his family moved from Dublin to London and he lived with his parents for the first time since the age of nine.

== Career ==
Crofton's first medical posts, in 1937, were casual posts at military hospitals: the Royal Herbert Hospital in Woolwich, and the Queen Alexandra Military Hospital. In August 1939, while temporarily unemployed, he arranged a climbing trip in the French Alps with friends; they were in Italy when they discovered that war was about to break out, and managed to get back into France the day before the border closed, and from there on crowded trains back to England. He then signed up with the Royal Army Medical Corps, serving in France, in Egypt with periods in Greece and Eritrea, and from 1942 to 1944 in Malta. He was then granted home leave and took up a posting in Northern Ireland, where he met his future wife, Eileen, also a qualified doctor. They married in December 1945, just three weeks after he suffered a broken nose in a car crash in Luneburg.

Demobilised, he started work at the Brompton Hospital, organising a controlled trial of the use of streptomycin in the treatment of tuberculosis, coordinated by the Medical Research Council: an appointment arranged by Guy Scadding, under whom Crofton had worked in wartime. After a while he was appointed a senior lecturer at the Brompton.

=== University of Edinburgh ===
At the University of Edinburgh, Scotland, Crofton was appointed chair of the Respiratory Diseases and Tuberculosis in 1952. In his clinical unit at the City Hospital he introduced and developed what came to be known as the "Edinburgh Method" for tuberculosis treatment. The essence of the method was the use of multiple drugs taken simultaneously to reduce the chance for drug-resistant strains of the tubercle bacilli to develop, this combined with careful monitoring of patients to ensure that they adhered to the prescribed medication regime. His team were able to demonstrate that mortality, and the spread of the disease in the community, could be reduced almost to zero if medication was properly prescribed and properly taken. The incidence of tuberculosis in Edinburgh declined rapidly, and Crofton spent much of the rest of his career travelling around the UK and the wider world attempting to get this message across.

Alongside tuberculosis, Crofton's other main work was in preventing tobacco-related medical problems. In this he worked closely with his wife Eileen, who from 1972 headed the Action on Smoking and Health (ASH) organisation in Scotland.

In 1952 Crofton was elected a member of the Harveian Society of Edinburgh and served as President in 1977.

From 1963 to 1966 Crofton was dean of medicine at the University of Edinburgh Medical School. From 1966 to 1969 he worked with Andrew Douglas on their postgraduate textbook, Respiratory Diseases. From 1969 to 1971, the period of student unrest all around the world, he was vice-principal of the university: during this time Gordon Brown (future prime minister) was elected by the students as rector. This had traditionally been a ceremonial post, but Brown decided to exercise his right as rector to chair the University Court. According to Crofton, Brown did the job very efficiently.

From 1972 until 1973 Crofton was the Vice President of the Royal College of Physicians of Edinburgh. From 1973 to 1976 Crofton was president of the Royal College of Physicians of Edinburgh.

=== International organizations ===
Crofton was chair of the International Union Against Tuberculosis and Lung Disease (IUATLD) from 1984 to 1988. He helped write the World Health Organization's guidelines for the treatment of tuberculosis before his death.

In 1998, Crofton was a founding member of a new UK and international tuberculosis charity, TB Alert. He served as TB Alert's honorary president from 1999 until his death in 2009. His support for the charity continues through The Sir John Crofton Fund to Fight TB and the Sir John Crofton Prize for TB Nursing.

== Recognition ==
After his 1977 retirement from Edinburgh, Crofton was knighted in the Silver Jubilee and Birthday Honours.

Crofton was the 2005 recipient of The Union Medal from the IUATLD. The Crofton Award, named in honour of the physician and his wife, physician Eileen Crofton, is given by the Royal Environmental Health Institute of Scotland (REHIS) and ASH Scotland, recognising the "contributions young people in Scotland make towards reducing the harm caused by tobacco".

Saving Lives and Preventing Misery: The memoirs of Sir John Wenman Crofton, was published in 2013 by Crofton's daughter and son-in-law.

Academic offices
Preceded by John Halliday Croom	President of the Royal College of Physicians of Edinburgh; 1973–1976	Succeeded by Ronald Foote Robertson
