= NWF (disambiguation) =

NWF usually refers to the National Wildlife Federation.

NWF may also refer to:

- National Wealth Fund (United Kingdom)
- Russian National Wealth Fund
- National Wrestling Federation, a former American professional wrestling association
- Newcastle Writers' Festival, a literary festival held in Newcastle, NSW, Australia
- Noble World Foundation, a non-profit organisation founded by Shiv R. Jhawar
- Northwest Field, a U.S. military airfield on the West Pacific island of Guam
- Northwest Front, a political movement founded by Harold Covington
- NWF Group, logistics company
