= Philip Stell =

British surgeon and historian

Professor Philip Michael Stell MBE FRCS FRCSE FRHistS FSA (14 August 1934 – 29 May 2004) was a British surgeon and historian. After a career in otolaryngology he retired early from his chair at the University of Liverpool and developed a second career as a medieval historian based in York; he was appointed MBE in 2004 "for services to history".

== Early life ==
Stell was born in Dewsbury, West Yorkshire, 14 August 1934, and attended Archbishop Holgate's Grammar School in York. He qualified in Medicine in 1958 at the University of Edinburgh. He worked in Edinburgh and in St Louis, Missouri, United States, before becoming a consultant in Liverpool in 1965, and professor there in 1979. He married Shirley Mills in 1959, and they had a daughter and four sons.

== Medical career ==
Stell's obituary in the British Medical Journal described him as "a dominant figure in head and neck surgery in Europe", while The Times said that he "was the first and most successful exponent of reconstructive surgery after head and neck cancer in this country" and that he "made countless advances in ear and throat surgery". The textbook he published as Head and Neck Surgery in 1972 with Arnold Maran (Heinemann, ISBN 0433315709) was republished in 2012 as Stell & Maran's Textbook of Head and Neck Surgery and Oncology, Fifth Edition by John Watkinson and Ralph W Gilbert (CRC Press, ISBN 978-0-340-92916-2). He published over 340 academic papers, edited 12 books and contributed to 39 others. He founded the journal Clinical Otolaryngology and Allied Sciences, later entitled Clinical Otolaryngology, and established the Otorhinolaryngological Research Society. Volume 1, Issue 1 of Clinical Otolaryngology and Allied Sciences, published in January 1976, included both a two-page Editorial "Why a new journal?" by Stell and A. D. Cheesman, and an 11-page review "Tumours of the Oropharynx" by Stell.

He was a talented linguist, fluent in Dutch, German, French, and Spanish, and an Associate of the Institute of Linguists; when lecturing overseas he would speak in the appropriate local language. He was an early user of computerised record-keeping to analyse the outcomes for his patients.

== Historical career ==
After retiring early from Liverpool in 1992 Stell moved to York and studied for an MA in Medieval History at the University of York, writing a thesis on "Medical care in late medieval York". In 1996 he joined the Centre for Medieval Studies at York as a research associate (honorary), and worked with computer voice recognition and other technologies to digitise documents about York and York Minster. He published six volumes of transcribed documents.

His contribution was recognised by his being awarded the fellowships of the Society of Antiquaries of London and the Royal Historical Society. In the 2004 New Year Honours he was appointed MBE "for services to history".

== Legacy ==
A stained-glass window commemorating Stell and his wife Shirley, who died in April 2004, was installed in 2005 in St Mary's Church, Haxby, near York.
