= Eileen Crofton =

British anti-smoking activist (1919–2010)

Lady Eileen Crofton MBE
- Born: Eileen Mercer; 28 March 1919; Liverpool, England
- Died: 8 October 2010 (aged 91); Edinburgh, Scotland
- Occupations: Physician; author
- Notable work: Angels of Mercy: A Woman's Hospital on the Western Front 1914–1918
- Spouse: John Crofton (m. 1945; died 2009)
- Children: 5

Lady Eileen Crofton MBE (28 March 1919 – 8 October 2010) was a British physician and author. She was best known for her anti-smoking campaigns.

== Early life and education ==
Crofton was born on 28 March 1919 in Liverpool. Her father was an electrical engineer. She attended North London Collegiate School and Somerville College in Oxford. She qualified as a doctor in 1943.

== Career ==
In 1944, Crofton joined the Royal Army Medical Corps. She was made a captain and posted in County Down, Northern Ireland. Between 1946 and 1949, Crofton worked at Brompton Hospital in London as a part-time clinical assistant.

In 1952, her family moved to Edinburgh when John Crofton became professor of tuberculosis and lung disease at the University of Edinburgh. In 1962, Crofton became a research assistant in medical epidemiology, and in 1963 she became the county medical officer for the Midlothian branch of the British Red Cross Society.

Crofton and her husband helped found ASH Scotland, an anti-smoking charity, in 1973, and she became the first medical director of the charity. Between 1975 and 1987, she also worked on the World Health Organization's expert committee on smoking. Crofton's campaigns were worldwide and focused on increasing regulations for tobacco and educating people on the harm that smoking can cause. She also campaigned for smoking bans in public places. Crofton was awarded an MBE for services in public health in 1984.

After her retirement in 1984, Crofton's anti-smoking campaigns continued. During her campaign work, Crofton attended an international medical conference at Royaumont, a former Cistercian abbey in France, where she found a plaque commemorating a Scottish women's hospital which operated out of the Abbey during the First World War. Realising that the story and background of this hospital was relatively unknown, Crofton researched and published a book on the Scottish Women's Hospital at Royaumont called, Angels of Mercy: A Woman's Hospital on the Western Front 1914-1918.

== Personal life ==
She met her husband, John Crofton, when she was working in County Down. They married in 1945 and had five children, three daughters and two sons.

== Death and legacy ==
She died on 8 October 2010.

In recognition of their campaigning and charity work, Crofton and her husband had an award named after them in 2009 by the Royal Environmental Health Institute of Scotland in collaboration with ASH Scotland. It is awarded to young people who work to reduce the harm caused by tobacco and smoking.

== Publications ==
- The social effects of chronic bronchitis : a Scottish study, 1965
- Questions people ask about smoking, 1977
- Smoking in Scottish hospitals : an ASH survey, 1977
- The sale of cigarettes in general and maternity hospitals in Scotland : an ASH enquiry, 1980
- The women of Royaumont : a Scottish Women's Hospital on the Western Front, 1996
- A painful inch to gain : personal experiences of early women medical students in Britain, 2013
- Angels of Mercy: A Woman's Hospital on the Western Front 1914-1918, 2013
