= Edinburgh City Hospital =

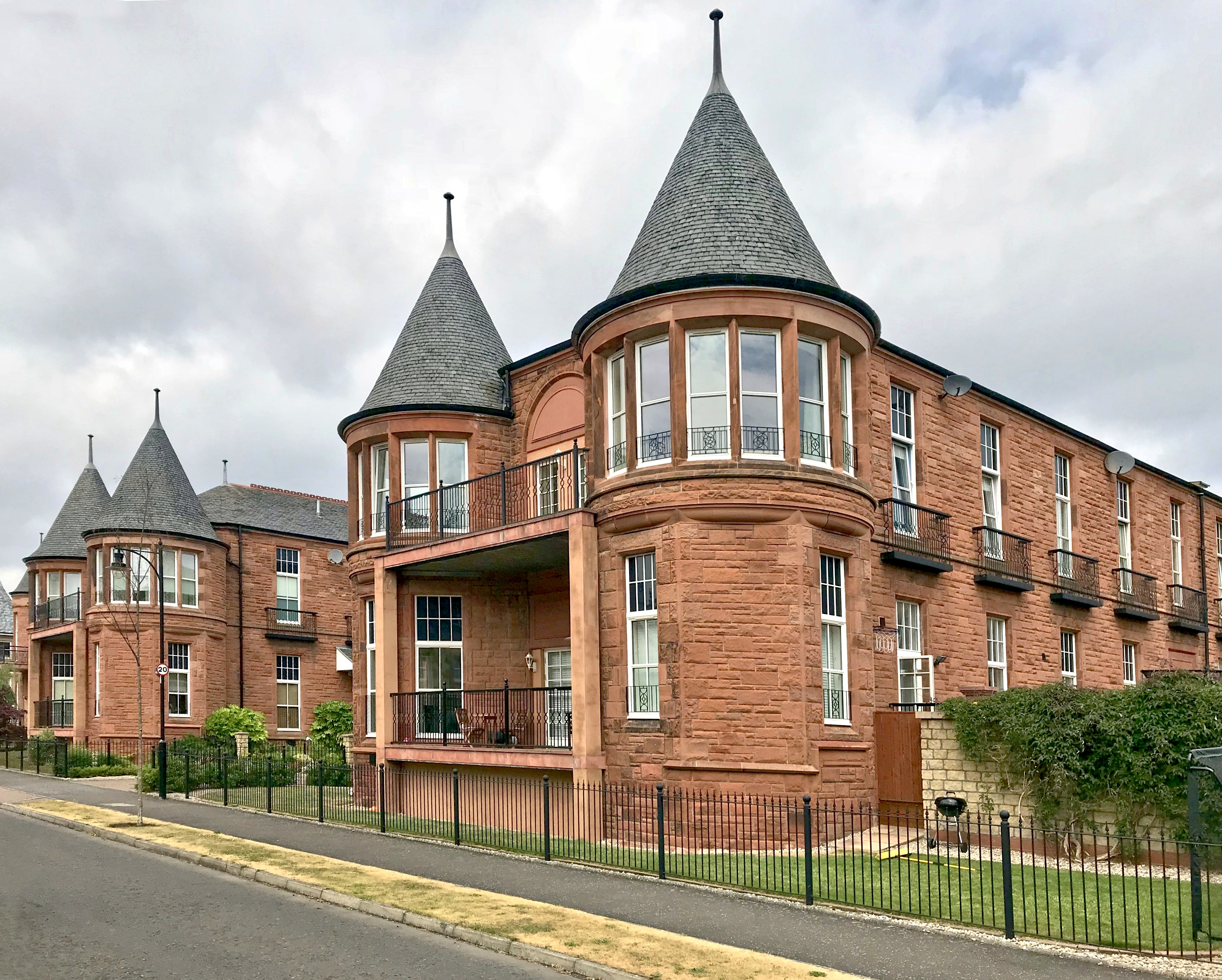
- Pavilions at former Edinburgh City Hospital now part of Greenbank Village, Edinburgh

- Shown in Edinburgh

Geography
- Location: Colinton, Edinburgh, Scotland
- Coordinates: 55°54′56″N 03°13′42″W

Organisation
- Care system: NHS
- Type: Specialist
- Affiliated university: University of Edinburgh

Services
- Speciality: Infectious disease, Otolaryngology, Care of the elderly

History
- Founded: 1903
- Closed: 1999

Links
- Lists: Hospitals in Scotland

The Edinburgh City Hospital (also known as the Edinburgh City Hospital for Infectious Diseases or the City Hospital at Colinton Mains) was a hospital in Colinton, Edinburgh, opened in 1903 for the treatment of infectious diseases. As the pattern of infectious disease changed, the need for in-patients facilities to treat them diminished. While still remaining the regional centre for infectious disease, in the latter half of the 20th century the hospital facilities diversified with specialist units established for respiratory disease, ear, nose and throat surgery, maxillo-facial surgery, care of the elderly and latterly HIV/AIDS. The hospital closed in 1999 and was redeveloped as residential housing, known as Greenbank Village.

== Origins ==
Local authorities in Scotland were required to make provision for the treatment and isolation of patients with infectious epidemic disease under the terms of the Public Health (Scotland) Act 1867 (30 & 31 Vict. c. 101). On the advice of Dr Henry Littlejohn, the medical officer of health, Edinburgh Town Council in 1870 converted Canongate Poorhouse into a fever hospital known as the First City Fever Hospital. This soon proved insufficient to meet the demand, and the Council bought the old Royal Infirmary buildings at Infirmary Street, and these together with the Surgical Hospital (the former Royal High School) and the former Surgeons Hall in Surgeons’ Square were opened as the Second City Fever Hospital in 1885. In the 1890s even this expanded accommodation was inadequate in the face of epidemics of smallpox and scarlet fever, and the city council decided to build a new fever hospital on a greenfield site at Colinton Mains, on the southern outskirts of the city, which became the Third City Fever Hospital.

== Design ==
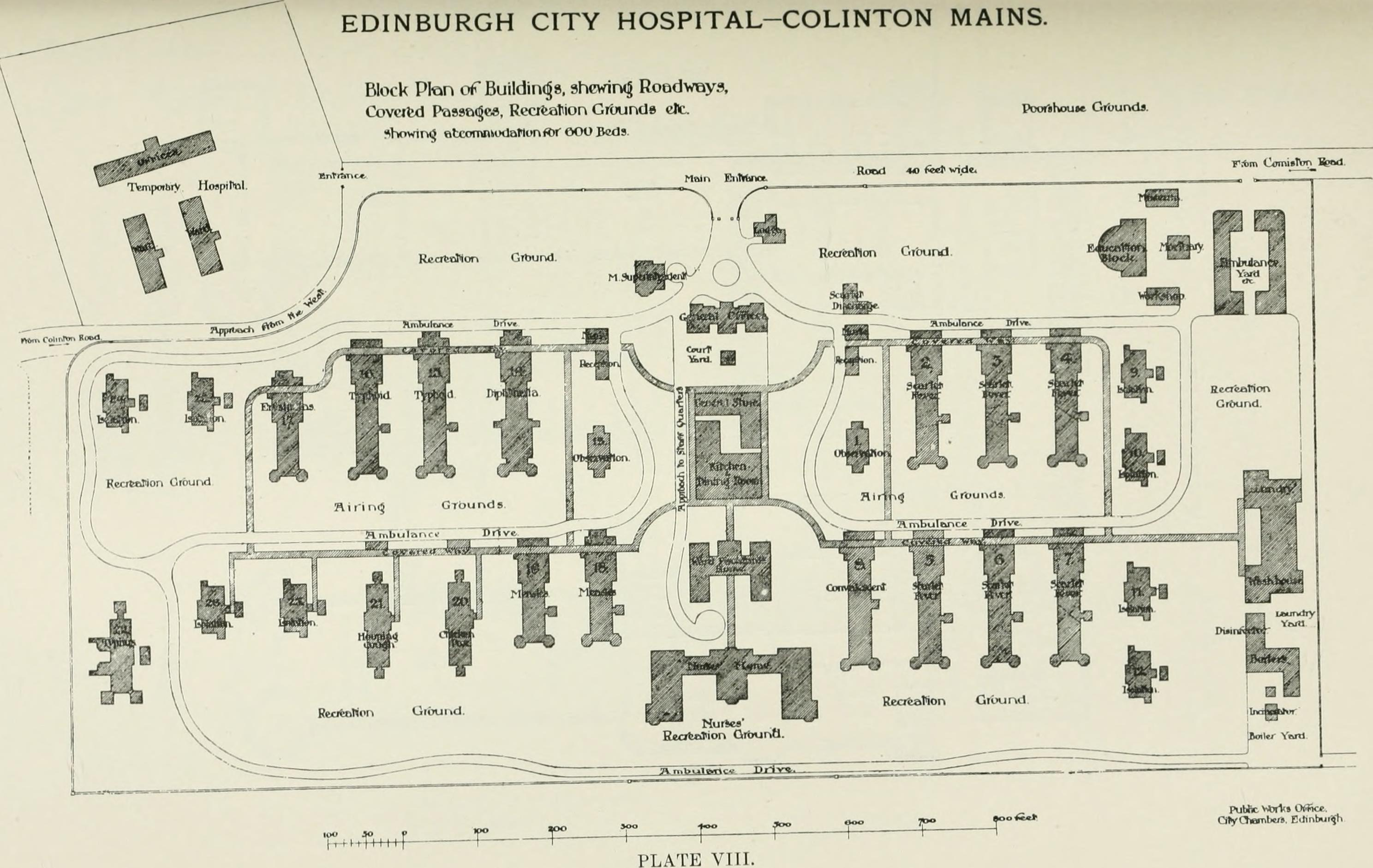
Plan of City Hospital, 1902

The hospital was on a greenfield site at Colinton on the southern outskirts of the city. It was built close to the Edinburgh City (Craiglockhart) Poorhouse, (which later became Greenlea Old People's Home, and was redeveloped in the 1980s as residential housing known as The Steils.) The Third City Hospital, now known as the Colinton Mains Fever Hospital, was designed by the Edinburgh City architect Robert Morham, who had toured European fever hospitals to incorporate their best features into his design. In Berlin he was told by Robert Koch that "sunlight is the great germicide", and this advice was followed. The hospital was built in red sandstone and consisted of fifteen two-storey Nightingale pavilions separated by grassy airing grounds to ensure spacing between wards and give them greater exposure to light. All included balconies and sun rooms. There were separate blocks for patients with individual diseases together with isolation cottages. In addition there was a nurses' home, accommodation for doctors, a central administrative block and a bacteriology laboratory. The hospital was surrounded by lawns and a small tree plantation.

== Early history ==
The hospital, now called the Edinburgh City Hospital for Infectious Diseases, was officially opened on 13 May 1903 by King Edward VII. From the earliest years it was a centre for nurse training and certification in infectious diseases with its own school of nursing. Much of the medical teaching and training for the Diploma in Public Health qualification took place in the hospital. Until the Second World War, the hospital dealt mainly with measles, typhus, scarlet fever, diphtheria and whooping cough. There were sporadic cases of smallpox, the last notification for this disease in Edinburgh being registered in 1942.

In 1948 the hospital became part of the National Health Service, administered initially by the South Eastern Regional Hospital Board.

There were 200 beds for tuberculosis when Dr John Crofton was appointed to the Edinburgh University Chair of Tuberculosis in 1952. Crofton established his academic unit and main clinical base at the City Hospital and pioneered a treatment that demonstrated that pulmonary tuberculosis could be cured by antibiotic therapy. He introduced an antibiotic treatment that became known as The Edinburgh method and used triple therapy of streptomycin, para-aminosalicylic acid (PAS) and isoniazid, which became the standard treatment of tuberculosis for the next fifteen years worldwide. Locally this resulted in a marked reduction in disease prevalence enabling more out-patient treatment. By 1958 only 20 beds were required for tuberculosis patients.

== Later history ==
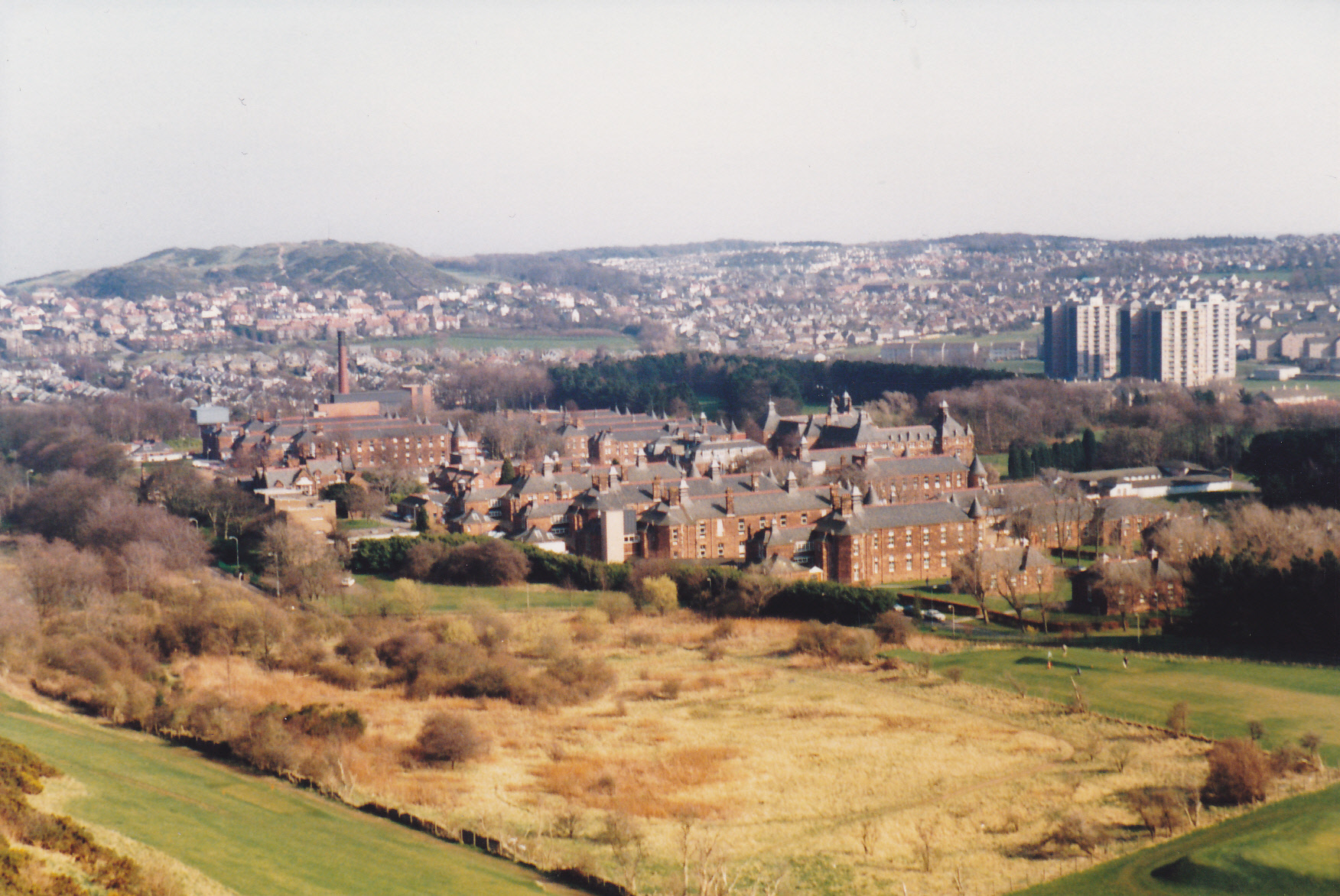
City Hospital, Edinburgh, 1988

In 1952 a thoracic surgery unit was established with Mr Andrew Logan as lead surgeon, initially to treat patients with surgically amenable pulmonary tuberculosis. It expanded to become the regional unit for all thoracic surgery, with cardiac surgery being largely performed at the Royal Infirmary of Edinburgh.

By the 1950s the introduction of antibiotics, effective immunisation and improved sanitation brought about a changing pattern of infectious disease. Pavilions were no longer needed for conditions like typhus, scarlet fever, diphtheria and whooping cough, and these beds were reallocated to other specialities. From this time the hospital became known simply as the Edinburgh City Hospital. An infectious diseases unit was established, catering for all infectious disease and associated with an attached tropical diseases unit from 1963 to 1972 and a unit devoted to the treatment of pyelonephritis.

In 1961 a Wellcome Trust virus research laboratory was opened. This was expanded and became the regional clinical virus laboratory. An enlarged bacteriology laboratory was opened in 1970 and expanded in 1989. This laboratory housed the Scottish mycobacteria reference laboratory. The Rayne Research laboratory was established in 1983 and conducted research into respiratory disease, particularly emphysema, sleep disorders and inflammatory cell biology.

The former tuberculosis wards became the respiratory disease unit.

In 1965 the ear, nose and throat department moved from the Royal Infirmary and in the 1976 a care of the elderly unit was opened.

As a result of the epidemic of HIV/AIDS in Edinburgh an AIDS screening service was set up in the hospital, the first of its kind in the UK. This was followed by the opening of a 14-bed unit for the in-patient treatment of HIV/AIDS.

In 1991 Milestone House, the first purpose-built AIDS hospice in the UK was established in the grounds of the hospital. In that year it was visited by Diana, Princess of Wales, and by Sean Connery.

The regional maxillofacial surgical unit was in the hospital from 1991 moving to St John's Hospital at Livingston in 1998.

== Closure and legacy ==
The hospital closed in 1999 and was redeveloped as residential housing, known as Greenbank Village. Streets in the development are named for Sir Henry Littlejohn and Robert Morham, reflecting the history of the hospital.

It was the subject of a book by James A. Gray, The Edinburgh City Hospital, published by Tuckwell Press in 1999.

== Notable staff ==
- Sir John Crofton, respiratory physician.
- Sir Neil Douglas, respiratory physician and specialist in sleep disorders.
- Alasdair Geddes, infectious diseases physician.
- Arnold Maran, ear, nose and throat surgeon.
