= Global Smoke-Free Partnership Award =

The Global Smokefree Partnership is a multipartner initiative formed to promote effective smokefree air policies worldwide. The Partnership works by helping practitioners and advocates of smokefree policies.

== Partners ==
The Partnership is currently hosted by the International Union Against Tuberculosis and Lung Disease (The Union) and the Framework Convention Alliance, and the current partners are listed below:

- Aer Pur Romania
- African Heart Network
- Afrique Contre le Tabac
- Alianca de Controle do Tabagismo de Brasil (ACT - Brazil)
- Alianza Libre de Humo Argentina (ALIAR)
- Alliance Nationale des Consommateurs et de l'Environment (ANCE - TOGO)
- American Cancer Society
- American Heart Association
- American University of Armenia
- Americans for Nonsmokers' Rights
- APALTA Honduras
- Asociaciòn Espanola Contral el Cancer
- Bangladesh Heart Foundation
- Campaign for Tobacco-Free Kids
- Centro de Investigacion para la Epidemìa del Tabaquismo (CIET)
- Comité National Contre le Tabagisme (CNCT)
- Dutch Heart Foundation
- European Healthy Stadia Network
- European Network for Smoking and Tobacco Prevention
- Framework Convention Alliance
- Fundaciòn Ecuatoriana de Salud Respiratoria (FESAR)
- Garant
- Generations Sans Tabac
- Global Bridges
- Health Related Information Dissemination Amongst Young (HRIDAY)
- HealthBridge
- Heart Foundation of Jamaica
- Heart and Stroke Foundation of South Africa
- Heart of Mersey
- Human Rights and Tobacco Control Network (HRTCN)
- Institute for Global Tobacco Control of Johns Hopkins University
- Interamerican Heart Foundation
- International Union Against Tuberculosis and Lung Disease (The Union)
- Isfahan Cardiovascular Research Institute
- ITC Project
- Jamaican Coalition for Tobacco Control
- Jeewaka Foundation
- King Hussein Cancer Center
- MACT India
- OxySuisse
- Public Health Law Center
- Regional Advocacy Center LIFE (Ukraine)
- Romanian Society of Pneumology
- Romtens Foundation
- Roswell Park Comprehensive Cancer Center
- SouthEast Asia Tobacco Control Alliance
- Stivoro
- Tobacco Prevention and Control Research center
- Treatobacco.net
- Volunteers Against Smoking and Tobacco
- Work for a Better Bangladesh (WBB) Trust
- World Heart Federation
- World Lung Foundation
- European Respiratory Society
- LILT - Italian Cancer League
- Global Dialogue for Effective Stop-Smoking Campaigns
