= Clinical Otolaryngology =

- Discipline: Otorhinolaryngology
- Language: English
- Edited by: James Tysome

Publication details
- Former names: Clinical Otolaryngology and Allied Sciences
- History: 1976-present
- Publisher: Wiley-Blackwell
- Frequency: Bimonthly
- Impact factor: 2.377 (2018)

Standard abbreviations
- ISO 4: Clin. Otolaryngol.

Indexing
- ISSN: 1749-4478 (print); 1749-4486 (web)
- OCLC no.: 58811916

Links
- Journal homepage; Online access; Online archive

Clinical Otolaryngology is a bimonthly peer-reviewed medical journal covering the field of otorhinolaryngology. It was established in 1976 as Clinical Otolaryngology and Allied Sciences, obtaining its current title in 2005. It is published by Wiley-Blackwell on behalf of ENT UK and the British Otorhinolaryngology & Allied Sciences Research Society (BOARS). The journal's scope is described as "clinically oriented research papers ... dealing with: current otorhinolaryngological practice; audiology, otology, balance, rhinology, larynx, voice and paediatric ORL; head and neck oncology; head and neck plastic and reconstructive surgery; and continuing medical education and ORL training."

== History ==
The journal was first published in 1976, with Philip Stell and A. D. Cheesman as editors-in-chief. Volumes 1-29 appeared under the title Clinical Otolaryngology and Allied Sciences; volume 30, 2005, was the first with the current, shortened title.

== Abstracting and indexing ==
The journal is abstracted and indexed in:

- Current Contents/Clinical Medicine
- EBSCO databases
- Embase
- Index Medicus/MEDLINE/PubMed
- Science Citation Index

According to the Journal Citation Reports, the journal has a 2015 impact factor of 2.627.
