= John Grange (immunologist) =

Professor John Grange (born 4 April 1943 at East Dereham, Norfolk) died 10 October 2016 was an English immunologist, epidemiologist, researcher, and academic, and was one of Europe's leading tuberculosis specialists.

== Education ==
Grange was educated at Gresham's School, Holt, Norfolk, and then from 1962 to 1967 at the Middlesex Hospital Medical School of the University of London.

== Career ==
After qualification as a physician, Grange joined the Research Department at the Middlesex Hospital, where he studied the genus Mycobacterium and the diseases it causes in humans and other animals. This followed a stay in Zaire to study the Buruli ulcer. His doctoral thesis was on the classification of certain rapidly growing mycobacteria and led to research on the development of bacteriophage typing of mycobacteria for epidemiology.

Next he was appointed Reader in Microbiology at the National Heart and Lung Institute, where his interests turned to the immunology and epidemiology of tuberculosis. From there he became assistant lecturer (1969-1970) at the Bland Sutton Institute of Pathology of Middlesex Hospital Medical School, University of London and then lecturer in the same school's Department of Microbiology from 1971 to 1976.

From 1976 to 2000, Grange was Reader in Clinical Microbiology at the Imperial College School of Medicine and honorary consultant Microbiologist to the Royal Brompton NHS Trust.

Between 1978 and 1995, he undertook a series of visits to Indonesia to pursue research into the immunology and epidemiology of tuberculosis.

From 1985 to 1995, he was an honorary research fellow at King's College Hospital Medical School. After retirement from ICL he became a visiting professor at the University College London Centre for Infectious Disease and International Health.

In his later years, Grange's interests turned to the causes of the world tuberculosis pandemic - poverty, inequity and injustice. He retired early from Imperial College London and to work for the British charity TB Alert, the Consultation on Health of the World Council of Churches and the International Society for Human Values.

== Career related activities ==
- Member of the International Union Against Tuberculosis and Lung Disease
- Founder member of the European Society for Mycobacteriology
- Founder, TB Alert, 1998
- Trustee, TB Alert, 1998-2000
- Member, Scientific Advisory Board of TB Alert, 2001 to date
- President, TB Focus since 2000
- Editor of Tubercle, 1990-1992
- Associate Editor of Tubercle and Lung Disease, 1992-1997
- Associate Editor of International Journal of Tuberculosis and Lung Disease 1997-1999
- Member of editorial board of Journal of Applied Bacteriology 1985-1990.

== Degrees ==
1967 - Bachelor of Medicine (London) 1967 - Bachelor of Surgery (London) 1974 - Doctor of Medicine (London) 1981 - Master of Science, Immunology (London)
