= Shiv R. Jhawar =

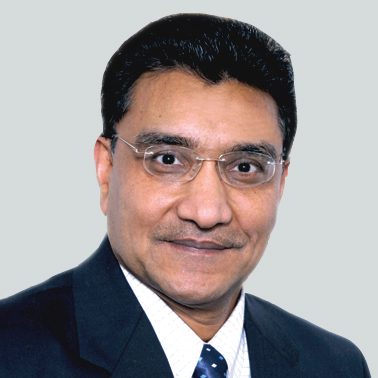
- Born: 1948 (age 77–78)
- Education: Master of Accounting Science, Enrolled to practice before the IRS, Chartered Accountant
- Alma mater: University of Illinois at Urbana-Champaign
- Known for: Noble World Foundation
- Notable work: Book - Building a Noble World
- Website: Noble World Foundation, SRJ Consulting

Shiv R. Jhawar (born 1948) is an Indian–American author, public speaker and entrepreneur. He is the author of the book Building a Noble World and has also published numerous political articles. He is the founder of Noble World Foundation, a non-profit organization whose stated mission is to promote the inner transformation of individuals through meditation. He is also outspoken about political reform and is known for his call to the United Nations to reform the UN Charter to allow for regional membership.

== Biography ==
Jhawar was born in Napasar in the Bikaner district of Rajasthan, India.

He attended the University of Calcutta in India where he graduated with a Bachelors of Commerce (Honors) degree in 1968, securing 7th rank in the Merit List of the University of Calcutta. He qualified as a chartered accountant and a Fellow of the Institute of Chartered Accountants of India in 1971. He taught at H.R. College of Commerce and Economics (during 1971–1973) before coming to US for higher studies.

Jhawar continued his higher education in 1973 when he came to the United States and attended the University of Illinois at Urbana-Champaign. While there, he was awarded a Master of Accounting Science Degree in 1974. He then went on to head a special project of computerized accounts analysis at CBS Television in Chicago prior to opening his own tax accounting practice under the firm name of SRJ Consulting in 1975 in the same city. He became an Enrolled Agent in 1979 in order to represent clients before the IRS.He is a member of National Association of Enrolled Agents.

Jhawar has been an IRS approved e-file provider ever since 1986 when the IRS first began the e-filing program for individual tax returns. He has written his own accounting software that he uses in his tax accounting practice. Jhawar was awarded Albert Nelson Marquis Lifetime Achievement Award for career achievements in 2018.

== Noble World Foundation ==
On June 10, 1978, at the ashram in Ganeshpuri, while Malti (Swami Chidvilasananda) was present, Baba Muktananda told Shiv Jhawar to open an independent center in Chicago. Jhawar founded the Noble World Foundation in 2004. The foundation is a non-profit, tax-exempt 501(c)(3) organization located in Illinois. Their website states that their mission is to "promote the inner transformation of individuals for peace, harmony, and well-being in the world."

In his book, Building a Noble World, Shiv R. Jhawar describes his Shaktipat experience at Muktananda's public program at Lake Point Tower in Chicago on 16 September 1974 as follows:

Baba [Swami Muktananda] had just begun delivering his discourse with his opening statement: 'Today's subject is meditation. The crux of the question is: What do we meditate upon?' Continuing his talk, Baba said: 'Kundalini starts dancing when one repeats Om Namah Shivaya.' Hearing this, I mentally repeated the mantra, I noticed that my breathing was getting heavier. Suddenly, I felt a great impact of a rising force within me. The intensity of this rising kundalini force was so tremendous that my body lifted up a little and fell flat into the aisle; my eyeglasses flew off. As I lay there with my eyes closed, I could see a continuous fountain of dazzling white lights erupting within me. In brilliance, these lights were brighter than the sun but possessed no heat at all. I was experiencing the thought-free state of "I am," realizing that "I" have always been, and will continue to be, eternal. I was fully conscious and completely aware while I was experiencing the pure "I am," a state of supreme bliss. Outwardly, at that precise moment, Baba delightfully shouted from his platform: 'mene kuch nahi kiya; kisiko shakti ne pakda (I didn't do anything. The Energy has caught someone.)' Baba noticed that the dramatic awakening of kundalini in me frightened some people in the audience. Therefore, he said, 'Do not be frightened. Sometimes kundalini gets awakened in this way, depending upon a person's type.'

His experience was also covered extensively in the book Rendezvous with God.

== Books and publications ==
Jhawar is the author of the book Building a Noble World which was published in 2004 by the Noble World Foundation (ISBN 0974919705). The book is the result of years of study and research into spirituality.R.R. Bowker called the book "an extraordinary blend of spirituality, politics, history, and science, address[ing] the key post-modern political issues that hinder world peace." The India Tribune stated that the book "offers practical solutions to the present-day world crisis." The book also received positive reviews from DesiTalk Newspaper in Chicago, the India Post, and the India Tribune. A significant prediction made by Swami Rama Tirtha for future India is quoted in the book, Building a Noble World: Rama Tirtha predicted: "After Japan, China will rise and gain prosperity and strength. After China, the sun of prosperity and learning will again smile at India."

Jhawar is the author of numerous scholarly articles related to both the mission of the Noble World Foundation and international politics.

=== Select publications ===
- 1 December 2001, India Tribune, "US must work for unification of subcontinent"
- 5 January 2002, India Tribune, "God is one like energy – manifests in many forms"
- 29 June 2002, India Tribune, "End terrorism and unify Indian subcontinent"
- 28 January 2006, India Tribune, "Coping with difficult times through power of thought"
- 15 July 2006, India Tribune, "Geopolitical revolution underway to outpace America"
- 6 January 2007, India Tribune, "Scrap veto, form regional unions to make UNSC effective"
- 5 October 2007, Indian Reporter, "Sleep Less, Refresh More"
- 7 February 2009, India Tribune, "Obama can help form regional unions for a better world"
- 27 February 2009, Indian Reporter, "Evolving Regional Unions for a Better Tomorrow"
- 27 May 2014, " India Post", "Rama Tirtha's vision coming alive"
- 13 June 2014, " India Post", "Swami Rama Tirtha's vision of India"

== United Nations reform ==
In 2010, Jhawar called for reform of the United Nations Security Council. He sent an open letter to UN Secretary-General Ban Ki-moon recommending that the UN Charter be amended to provide for the membership of regional unions, beginning with the European Union. He professed that regional unions with appropriate qualifications should be eligible for permanent seats in the Security Council. By adding permanent seats for regional unions, he stated that the UN can dilute the veto power without downgrading the P5. The Secretary General of the League of Arab States Amre Moussa responded to Jhawar's call by stating that the League will give the initiative its due attention and promote the issue with the member states in the contexts of the UN reform process.

In 2023, Shiv R. Jhawar, through his Noble World Foundation (NWF), proposed a structural reform of the United Nations Security Council (UNSC). NWF proposes changing the structure of the United Nations Security Council (UNSC) by shifting membership and veto power from individual states to regional organizations like the European Union. This proposed shift is in line with the UNSC's existing practice of basing the selection of non-permanent members on regional representation.The reform aims to make the UNSC more democratic, effective, and representative of the global community.

The proposal was formulated in response to the limitations and challenges faced by the UNSC in addressing global conflicts, particularly highlighted by the incidents where individual member states used their veto power against widely supported resolutions. A prime example of this issue was observed on February 25, 2022, when Russia used its veto power to block a resolution against its invasion of Ukraine, thereby underscoring a significant weakness in the UNSC's functioning. By advocating for regional unions to hold membership and veto power, Jhawar's proposal aims to mitigate the deadlock caused by national interests and foster a more unified approach to global peacekeeping.

== Personal life ==
Jhawar lives in Chicago and gives talks both in the United States and abroad.
