= Rama Tirtha =

Indian teacher (1873–1906)

Swami Rama Tirtha
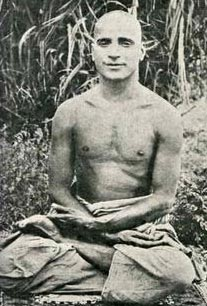
- Swami Rama Tirtha

Personal life
- Born: 22 October 1873 Village Muraliwala, British India (present-day Gujranwala District, Punjab)
- Died: 17 October 1906 (aged 32) Tehri, United Province, British India
- Known for: Preaching Vedanta in the United States
- Website: www.ramatirtha.org

Religious life
- Religion: Hinduism
- Philosophy: Advaita Vedanta

Religious career
- Disciples: Puran Singh, Narayan Swami

Swami Rama Tirtha ( 22 October 1873 – 17 October 1906), also known as Swami Rama, was an Indian teacher of the Hindu philosophy of Vedanta. He was among the first notable teachers of Hinduism to lecture in the United States, travelling there in 1902, preceded by Swami Vivekananda in 1893 and followed by Paramahansa Yogananda in 1920. During his American tours Swami Rama Tirtha spoke frequently on the concept of "practical Vedanta" and education of Indian youth. He proposed bringing young Indians to American universities and helped establish scholarships for Indian students.

== Biography ==
Rama Tirtha was born in a Gosvami Brahmin family to Pandit Hiranand Goswami on 22 October 1873 (Deepawali Vikram Samvat 1930) in the village of Muraliwala in the Gujranwala District of Punjab, Pakistan. His mother died when he was a few days old and he was raised by his elder brother Gossain Gurudas. After receiving a master's degree in mathematics from The Government College of Lahore, he became professor of mathematics at Forman Christian College, Lahore. Meanwhile, he started studying Vedanta, inspired by Sri Madhava Tirtha of the Dwarka Math.

A chance meeting with Swami Vivekananda in 1897 in Lahore, inspired his later decision to take up the life of a sannyasi. Having become well known for his speeches on Krishna and Advaita Vedanta he became a swami in 1899 on the day of Deepawali, leaving his wife, his children and his professorial chair. Subsequently, he lived in the forests of Brahmapuri, on the banks of the river Ganges, five miles from Rishikesh.

"As a sannyasi, he neither touched any money nor carried any luggage with him. In spite of it he went round the world." A trip to Japan to teach Hinduism was sponsored by Maharaja Kirti Shah Bahadur of Tehri. From there he travelled to the United States of America in 1902, where he spent two years lecturing on Hinduism, other religions, and his philosophy of "practical Vedanta". He frequently spoke about the iniquities emanating from the caste system in India and the importance of education of women and of the poor, stating that "neglecting the education of women and children and the labouring classes is like cutting down the branches that are supporting us – nay, it is like striking a death-blow to the roots of the tree of nationality." Arguing that India needed educated young people, not missionaries, he began an organization to aid Indian students in American universities and helped to establish a number of scholarships for Indian students.

He always referred to himself in the third person, which is a common spiritual practice in Hinduism in order to detach oneself from Ego.

Although upon his return to India in 1904 large audiences initially attended his lectures, he completely withdrew from public life in 1906. As he suffered ill health, he moved to the foothills of the Himalaya and settled at Vasishtha Ashram near Rishikesh. Here he prepared to write a book giving a systematic presentation of practical Vedanta. Tirtha died on 17 October 1906 (Deepawali Vikram Samvat 1963), and the book was never finished. His lectures and writing have been published as In Wood of God-Relization in 7 Volumes by Swami Rama Tirtha Pratisthan.

Many believe he did not die but gave up his body to the river Ganges.

A significant prediction made by Swami Rama Tirtha for future India is quoted in Shiv R. Jhawar's book, Building a Noble World. Rama Tirtha predicted: "After Japan, China will rise and gain prosperity and strength. After China, the sun of prosperity and learning will again smile at India."

== Legacy ==
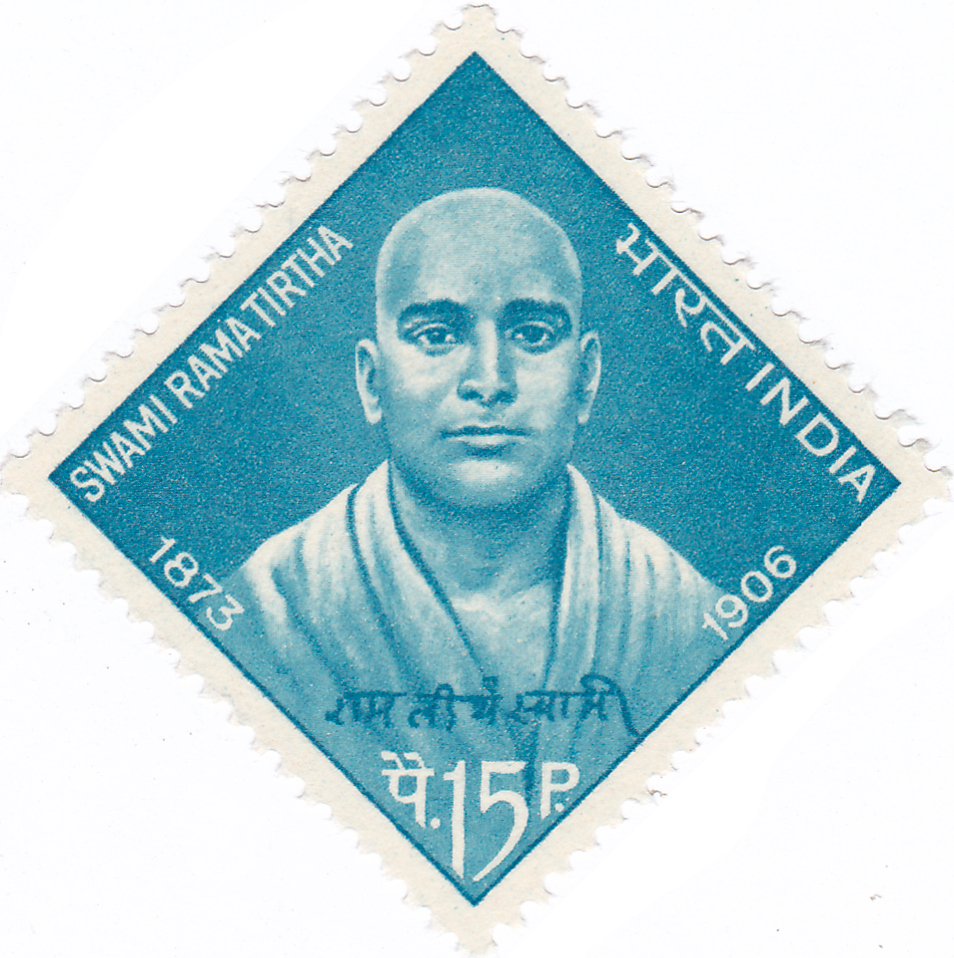
Rama Tirtha on a 1966 stamp of India

Punjabi Indian nationalist Bhagat Singh uses Tirtha as an example of the great contributions Punjab had made to the Indian nationalist movement in his essay "The Problem of Punjab's Language and Script". The lack of memorials to Tirtha is given by Singh as an example of the lack of respect for Punjab's contributions to the movement.

Indian Revolutionary Pandit Ram Prasad Bismil depicted the character of Swami Rama Tirtha in the poem Yuva Sannyasi.

Two of his disciples, S. Puran Singh and Narayana Swami, wrote biographies. Puran Singh's The Story of Swami Rama: The Poet Monk of the Punjab appeared in 1924 and was published in English as well as in Hindi. Narayana Swami's untitled account was published in 1935 as a part of Rama Tirtha's collected works.

A further account of his life was written by Hari Prasad Shastri and published with poems by Swami Rama Tirtha translated by H P Shastri as 'Scientist and Mahatma' in 1955.

Paramahansa Yogananda translated many of Rama Tirtha's poems from Bengali into English and put some of them to music: one, entitled "Marching Light", appeared in Yogananda's book Cosmic Chants, as "Swami Rama Tirtha's Song".

== Contribution of Swami ji ==
The Swami Rama Tirtha Mission Ashram is located at Kotal Gaon Rajpura, near Dehra Dun in Uttarakhand, India.

One of three campuses of Hemwati Nandan Bahuguna Garhwal University, situated at Badshahi Thaul, New Tehri, is known as the Swami Rama Tirtha Parisar (SRTC).

His sister's son H. W. L. Poonja became a noted Advaita teacher in Lucknow, while Hemant Goswami, his great-grandson, is a social activist based in Chandigarh.

== Bibliography ==
- Parables of Rama by Swami Rama Tirtha. Rama Tirtha Pratisthan. 1956
- In Woods of God Realization - Swami Rama Tirtha Complete Works: Vol 1
- In Woods of God Realization - Swami Rama Tirtha Complete Works: Vol 2
- In Woods of God Realization - Swami Rama Tirtha Complete Works: Vol 3
- Swami Rama Tirtha Granthavali - Vol. 1 (Hindi)
- Practical Vedanta Selected Works of Swami Rama Tirtha: Selected Works of Swami Rama Tirtha. 1978, Himalayan Institute Press. ISBN 0-89389-038-3.
- Practical Vedant: Philosophy Of Swami Rama Tirtha by B. L. Atreya. Ram Tirtha Pratisthan. 1966.
- Swami Rama Tirtha (Biography) by Vinod. Rajpal And Sons, Delhi.
- Yoga and the Supreme Bliss : Songs of Enlightenment. Swami Rama Tirtha, 1982, trans. A.J. Alston. ISBN 0-9508019-0-9.
- Life, Teachings And Writings Of Swami Rama Tirtha, by Prem Lata. Sumit Publications, ISBN 81-7000-158-7.
- Swami Rama Tirtha – A Great Mystic Poet of India.
- An article on Swami Rama Tirtha in "The Legacy of The Punjab" by R. M. Chopra, 1997, Punjabee Bradree, Calcutta.
- Sivananda, Swami (2005). "Swami Rama Tirtha (1873–1906)". Life of Saints. Divine Life Society.
- "Rama In The Eyes of Iqbal". 2010 by Dr. Kedarnath Prabhakar & Dr. Akash Chanda ( ISBN 978-81-921205-0-8)
- "Wehdatnama: A Bouquet of Punjabi Vedantic Poetry of Swami Ramtirtha" 2013 by Dr. Kedarnath Prabhakar & Dr. Akash Chanda ( ISBN 978-81-921205-2-2)
- "Muscular Vedanta: The Practical Form of Vedanta Philosophy Propounded by Swami Ramtirtha". 2011 by Dr. Kedarnath Prabhakar & Dr. Akash Chanda ( ISBN 978-81-921205-1-5)
- "Scientist and Mahatma: The Life and Teachings of Swami Rama Tirtha" (2nd ed. 2006) by Hari Prasad Shastri. Shanti Sadan. ISBN 0-85424-008-X.
- "Spiritual Laws of Nature as revealed by Swami Rama Tirtha" 2023 authored by Ajayya Gulati available on Amazon India.
