= Smokefree Coalition =

New Zealand anti-smoking organisation

The Smokefree Coalition was established as a national organisation in New Zealand in 1995 to advocate for tobacco control interventions by government and non-government organisations (NGOs). Its founding organisations were the National Heart Foundation of New Zealand, the Cancer Society of New Zealand, Action on Smoking and Health (Ash NZ), Te Hotu Manawa Māori (a division of the National Heart Foundation) and the Asthma and Respiratory Foundation of New Zealand. It ceased operation on 30 June 2016.

== Background ==
Motivations for establishing the Smokefree Coalition included perceived gaps in the Smoke-free Environments Act 1990. It was believed the Smokefree Coalition could do advocacy to help close these gaps and that, while each of the founding organisations had tobacco control as a focus, a new entity was needed that could speak nationally to represent the tobacco control interests of these and other organisations who would later join.

The Smokefree Coalition became incorporated as a charitable trust in 1997 after which it entered into a contract with the Health Funding Authority, and later the Ministry of Health.

== Vision, mission and objectives ==
The Smokefree Coalition adopted as its vision that New Zealand would become smokefree. Its mission statement was that it "will work to improve the health of all New Zealanders by reducing tobacco use and its health consequences. It will advocate for a smokefree Aotearoa New Zealand."

This was to be achieved through:

- researching and compiling information on smoking issues in New Zealand and internationally
- disseminating this information to members, Government and the general public
- advocating for strong tobacco control measures, especially through legislation and regulation (including enforcement), taxation and health promotion
- co-ordinating the advocacy efforts of agencies involved in tobacco control with the objective of providing a unified approach to Government on such matters.

The Smokefree Coalition supported the principles of New Zealand's founding document, the Treaty of Waitangi and the principles and strategies endorsed by the Ottawa Charter.

== Governance ==
The Smokefree Coalition was governed by a board of trustees who provided strategic direction, ensured the financial viability of the organisation and oversaw the activities of the executive director. Board members were appointed for a three-year term. However, in November 2007 the Deed of Trust was varied to remove the restriction on the term for which a board member appointed by one of the five founding organisations may hold office.

The Chair of the Smokefree Coalition, appointed by the Board, assumed the role of employer of the executive director and presided over all meetings of the Board. The executive director was responsible for the day-to-day finances of the Smokefree Coalition, acted as its spokesperson and worked to further its goals and objectives.

Executive Directors of the Smokefree Coalition were as follows:

- Barbara Langford 1995–1999
- Leigh Sturgiss 1999–2005
- Mark Peck 2005–2009
- Dr Prudence Stone 2009–2016.

== Membership ==
Membership of the Smokefree Coalition was restricted to organisations with an interest in tobacco control. Individual memberships were not allowed. Member organisations were required to endorse the Smokefree Coalition's vision and commit to active participation and collective advocacy within the Coalition.

Organisations who were members of the Smokefree Coalition included:

Action on Smoking and Health (New Zealand)	Pacific Heartbeat
Ara Taiohi	Pacific Canterbury Trust
The Asian Network Inc (TANI)	The Paediatric Society of New Zealand
The Asthma and Respiratory Foundation of New Zealand	The Pharmacy Guild of New Zealand
Barnardo's New Zealand	Phocus on Health
The Cancer Society of New Zealand	Physiotherapy New Zealand
The Cardiac Society of Australia and New Zealand	The Problem Gambling Foundation of New Zealand
The College of Nurses Aotearoa (NZ) Inc	The Quit Group
Consumer NZ	The Royal Australian and New Zealand College of Obstetricians and Gynaecologists
Diabetes NZ	The Royal Australasian College of Physicians
Family Planning NZ	The Royal New Zealand College of General Practitioners
Hāpai Te Hauora	The Plunket Society
Health Action (Nelson)	Smokechange/Innova8
Healthcare New Zealand	Smokefree Nurses Aotearoa NZ
The Health Promotion Forum	The Royal Australian and New Zealand College of Psychiatrists
Inspiring Ltd	The Stroke Foundation of New Zealand
It's My Life	TAHA Well Pacific Mother and Infant
The Lung Foundation of New Zealand	Tala Pasifika
The Mental Health Foundation of New Zealand	Te Kupenga Hauora Ahuriri
The National Heart Foundation of New Zealand	Te Ohu Rata Aotearoa
The New Zealand College of Midwives	Te Reo Marama
The New Zealand Dental Association	Te Runanga o Aotearoa
The New Zealand Drug Foundation	Te Tohu o Te Ora o Ngāti Awa
The New Zealand Medical Association	The Thoracic Society of Australia and New Zealand (NZ Branch)
The New Zealand Nurses Organisation	Whakawhetu/Māori SIDS

== Areas of work ==
The Smokefree Coalition focused on a range of issue in its work to reduce tobacco use and its health consequences. These included advocacy to achieve: reducing smoking initiation by young people; limiting allowances for duty-free tobacco; removing the descriptors of 'light' and 'mild' from tobacco branding; banning tobacco advertising and displays at point of retail sale; raising tobacco excise tax; introducing pictorial warnings on tobacco packs; introducing standardised packaging; introducing a register of tobacco retailers; and banning smoking in cars carrying minors.

=== Smokefree environments ===
In its early years the Smokefree Coalition made a submission to the Social Services Select Committee in support of the Smoke-free Environments Amendment Bill. This Bill was passed into law in 2003 and, among other things, banned smoking in New Zealand workplaces, including bars and restaurants. New Zealand was one of the first countries in the world to enact legislation to prevent all workers, including those in hospitality, from the dangers of second-hand smoke.

=== 'Light' and 'mild' descriptors ===
In 2007 the Smokefree Coalition complained to the Commerce Commission about comments made by British and American Tobacco about harms from second-hand smoke and about 'light' and 'mild' descriptors in tobacco branding. It argued these descriptors gave the false impression that tobacco products carrying them were less harmful.

In response the Commerce Commission warned the tobacco industry against the use of descriptors and accepted an assurance from the tobacco industry that all such descriptors would be removed.;

=== The Smokefree 2025 goal ===
In 2009 the Smokefree Coalition endorsed the Māori Affairs Select Committee's call for the New Zealand tobacco industry to give an account of the role it plays in causing both sickness and early deaths among Māori. It was this Select Committee's Inquiry Report which inspired the New Zealand Government's commitment to making New Zealand a Smokefree nation by 2025.

In 2010 the Smokefree Coalition launched Tupeka Kore Aotearoa 2020 Tobacco Free New Zealand 2020 Achieving the Vision. This included a timeline outlining the actions necessary to achieve the vision of New Zealand being smokefree by 2020.

This document advocated for regulating tobacco's supply and eliminating demand for tobacco altogether. Later the Smokefree Coalition modified the target date for a smokefree New Zealand from 2020 to 2025 to align with the Government's commitment.

However, the Smokefree Coalition was critical of the New Zealand Government for not putting in place a strategy to achieve the 2025 goal. On 26 May 2016 the Smokefree Coalition organised a protest outside Parliament in Wellington where students lay on the ground as if dead to represent the "5000 New Zealanders who die from smoking-related illnesses every year". Then Director Dr Prudence Stone said five years [after the announcement of the goal] they were still waiting for a strategy.

=== Smokefree Action Plan 2015–2018 and Roadmap ===
In 2015, concerned that New Zealand was not on target to reach the Smokefree 2025 goal, the Smokefree Coalition worked with New Zealand's National Smokefree Working Group to publish a Smokefree National Action Plan and Roadmap for the tobacco control sector.

This Action Plan 2015–2018 and Roadmap set out the key strategic be undertaken before 2018 to place New Zealand back on track to achieve Smokefree 2025 goal. Its 13 stated priorities were:

- Deliver comprehensive cessation services tailored to community needs
- Increase tobacco control mass media
- Utilise the best cessation technologies
- Develop a policy response to Electronic Nicotine Delivery Systems (ENDS)
- Implement standardised tobacco packaging
- Increase the price of tobacco products through increased taxation
- Restrict tobacco supply
- Control tobacco product content
- Ensure full implementation of the World Health Organisation's Framework Convention on Tobacco Control (FCTC)
- Continue expansion of Smokefree environments
- Ensure New Zealanders know about and support initiatives required to achieve Smokefree 2025
- Raise public awareness about the tobacco industry's conduct so it mistrusts its information and strategies
- Raise public awareness of tobacco addiction so people who smoke are not stigmatised.

=== Trans Pacific Partnership ===
In 2016 the Smokefree Coalition backed calls by health professionals to Trade Minister Hon Tim Groser, calling for a comprehensive and independent health impact assessment of the Trans Pacific Partnership Agreement before New Zealand signed it.

The Smokefree Coalition's concern was that the Agreement would allow tobacco companies to take countries into international arbitration if they enacted health-based legislation, such as plain packaging requirements, that would impact on those companies' profits or intellectual property. The Coalition believed even the threat of such action could cause New Zealand and other countries to hesitate before enacting policy and laws that would protect the health of their people.

=== Tobacco Control Update ===
The Smokefree Coalition produced an e-bulletin, the Tobacco Control Update, each fortnight. This was emailed freely to all members and subscribers and featured: national and international tobacco control news; news from national tobacco control organisations, news from the regions, key events in the tobacco control calendar, updates from Government; tobacco industry activities and future tobacco control directions.

The Smokefree Coalition published its last Tobacco Control Update (issue 296) on 22 June 2016.

A new fortnightly version of the Tobacco Control Update is now being published by Hāpai Te Hauora, which was awarded New Zealand's newly consolidated (single) smokefree advocacy contract by the Ministry of Health in 2016. The first new edition was published 16 November 2016. Permission was granted by the Smokefree Coalition and the Quit Group to also call this new publication the Tobacco Control Update.

== Criticism ==
The Smokefree Coalition was criticised for using government funding to engage in advocacy. In 2012 Kiwiblog writer David Farrar said the New Zealand Government should not be "effectively paying people to lobby Parliament and the Government a specific way" and that NGOs using government money to campaign for what the law should be is the "thin end of corruption".

He noted that the Smokefree Coalition received $167,213 in 2011 and 2010 and $179,890 in 2009 from Government, representing 98 percent, 96 percent and 95 percent of its funding in each of those years.

In 2016 Whaleoil Blogger Cameron Slater wrote that the Smokefree Coalition and other anti-smoking lobby groups "receive an inordinate amount of publicity for their efforts, but governments should not be funding advocacy groups".

He said anti-smoking lobby groups, including the Smokefree Coalition, had been ineffective with the number of smokers in New Zealand only having dropped from 700,000 to 600,000 in the last five years at a cost of more than $300 million.

== Closure ==
The Smokefree Coalition ceased operation on 30 June 2016 after a Government decision not to renew the contracts of all tobacco control organisations. It held its final annual general meeting and ceased being registered as a charitable trust on 30 January 2017.

In place of the Smokefree Coalition and other tobacco control organisations the Ministry of Health (New Zealand) awarded a single national anti-smoking advocacy contract to West Auckland-based Māori health agency Hāpai Te Hauora.
