= Robert Kilpatrick, Baron Kilpatrick of Kincraig =

Professor The Right Honourable The Lord Kilpatrick of Kincraig CBE FRCPE FRCP FRSE

President of the General Medical Council
- In office 1989–1995

Professor of Medicine, University of Leicester
- In office 1984–1989

Professor of Clinical Pharmacology and Therapeutics, University of Leicester
- In office 1975–1983

Professor of Clinical Pharmacology and Therapeutics, University of Sheffield
- In office 1966–1975

Member of the House of Lords
- Lord Temporal
- Life peerage 16 February 1996 – 16 September 2015

Personal details
- Born: Robert Kilpatrick; 29 July 1926 Scotland
- Died: 16 September 2015 (aged 89)
- Occupation: Physician

Robert Kilpatrick, Baron Kilpatrick of Kincraig (29 July 1926 – 16 September 2015) was a Scottish physician, educator, academic and former President of the General Medical Council.

== Life ==
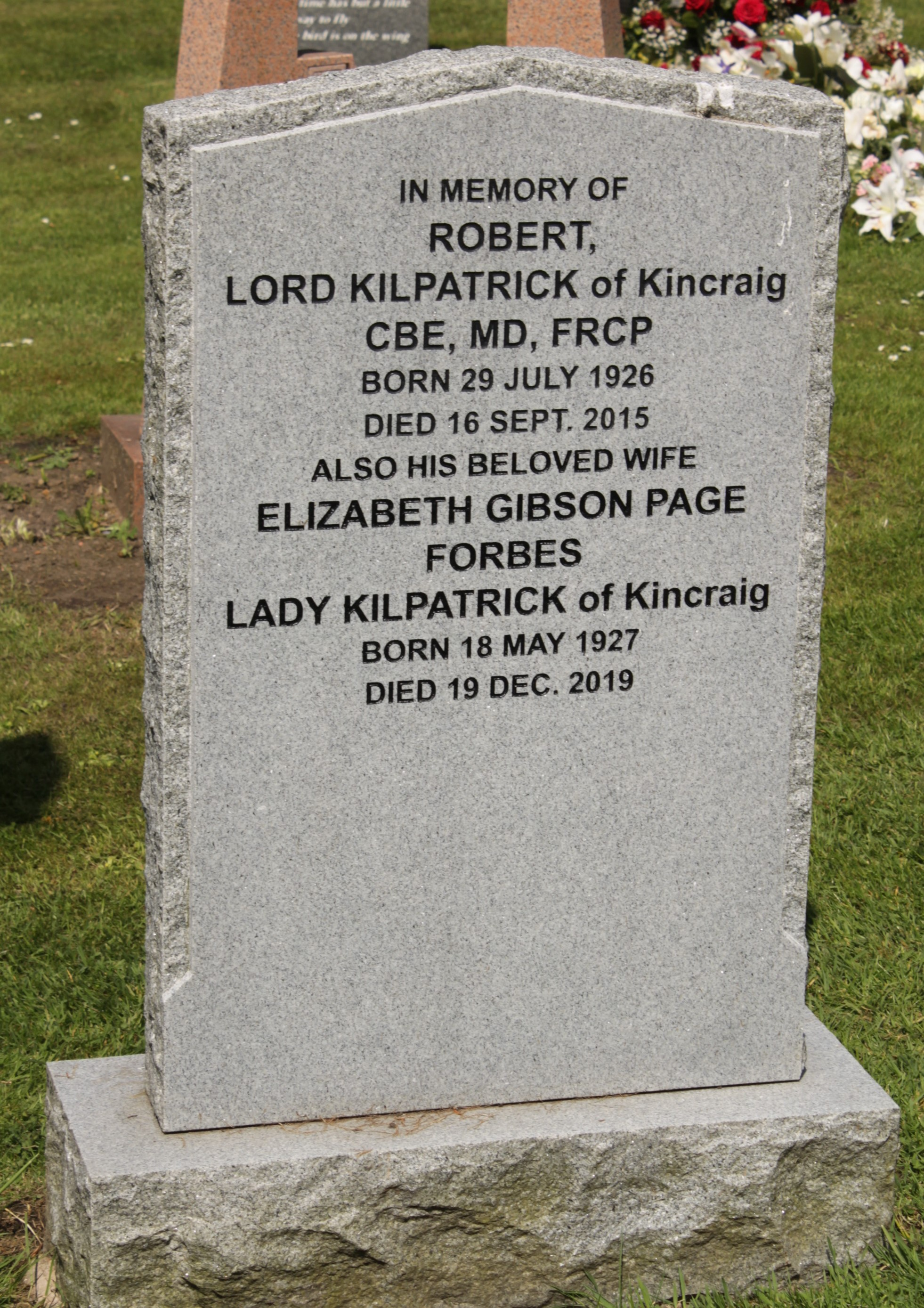
The grave of Lord Kilpatrick of Kincraig, Dean Cemetery

Kilpatrick was educated at Buckhaven High School, and studied medicine at the University of Edinburgh, graduating in 1949 with a Bachelor of Surgery (ChB).

Having suffered from tuberculosis when he was younger and been one of the first patients to be treated with the antibiotic streptomycin, Kilpatrick was a patron of the charity TB Alert.

He died in 2015 at the age of 89. He is buried in Dean Cemetery immediately to the south-west of the main entrance.

== Career ==
He served as lecturer and dean at Sheffield, Leicester, Dundee and Edinburgh Universities. He was elected a member of the Harveian Society of Edinburgh.

Appointed a Commander of the Order of the British Empire (CBE) in 1979, he was knighted in 1986. Announced in the 1996 New Year Honours, he was created life peer as Baron Kilpatrick of Kincraig, of Dysart in the district of Kirkcaldy on 16 February 1996. He sat as a crossbencher.

== Family ==
Kilpatrick married Elizabeth (Bette) Gibson Page Forbes (1927–2019) in 1950. The couple had two sons and a daughter.

== Honours and arms ==
- Hon DUniv Edinburgh, 1987
- Hon LLD Univ of Dundee, 1992
- Hon DSc Univ of Hull, 1994
- Hon DSc Univ of Leicester, 1994
- Hon LLD Univ of Sheffield, 1995
- Hon FRCPath, 1994
- Hon FRCS, 1995
- Hon FRCP (Dublin), 1995
- Hon FRCSEd, 1996
- FRCPE, 1963
- FRCP, 1975
- FRCP (Glasgow), 1991
- FRSE, 1998

Coat of arms of Robert Kilpatrick, Baron Kilpatrick of Kincraig

Crest
A swan’s head neck erased Proper holding in the beak a veronica flower slipped Proper.
Escutcheon
Per chevron Sable and Or in chief a plate charged with a saltire Gules accompanied by two swans respectant with wings expanded Proper and in base in a sea undy Azure and Argent a three masted ship Sable sails Proper and flagged of Scotland.
Motto
Laborare Semper Laborare

== Sources ==
- Hansard reference
- Parliament.uk
