= Arnold Maran =

Scottish head and neck surgeon and otolaryngologist

Arnold Maran MD FRCSEd FRCS FACS
- Professor Arnold Maran
- Born: 16 June 1936; Edinburgh, Scotland
- Died: 10 December 2017 (aged 81); Edinburgh, Scotland
- Education: Daniel Stewart's College, Edinburgh
- Alma mater: University of Edinburgh
- Occupation: Head and neck surgeon. Otorhinolaryngologist
- Known for: Stell and Maran’s Textbook of Head and Neck Surgery and Oncology; Professor of Head and Neck Surgery University of Edinburgh; President of the Royal College of Surgeons of Edinburgh

Arnold George Dominic Maran (16 June 1936 – 10 December 2017) MD, FRCSEd, FRCSEng, FACS, FRCPE was a Scottish head and neck surgeon and otolaryngologist. Having trained in ear, nose and throat surgery in Edinburgh, Scotland he then had further training as a head and neck surgeon in the United States and returned to a consultant post in Dundee, Scotland. Moving to Edinburgh he was awarded a personal chair in otorhinolaryngology by the University of Edinburgh. In collaboration with Professor Philip Stell of Liverpool he devised training courses in head and neck surgery and together they wrote Stell and Maran’s Textbook of Head and Neck Surgery and Oncology which became a popular textbook for the subspeciality. Maran went on to establish a clinic for voice disorders in Edinburgh which attracted professional singers and celebrities. He was elected president of the Royal College of Surgeons of Edinburgh in 1997.

== Early life ==
Arnold Maran was born in Edinburgh in 1936 of Italian descent. He was the only child of John Maran, a confectioner and his wife, Hilda (née Mancini), a seamstress. His paternal grandfather had come from Italy to Scotland in the late 19th century, settling in Leith. Maran was educated at Daniel Stewart’s College, Edinburgh where he played rugby for the first XV and became an accomplished pianist.

== Medical career ==
Maran studied medicine at the University of Edinburgh, graduating MB ChB in 1959. He trained in ear, nose and throat (ENT) surgery in Edinburgh qualifying FRCSEd in 1963. In 1964 he spent a year in the US at the University of Iowa learning specialist techniques of head and neck surgery. He returned to the UK to take up a post as consultant ENT surgeon at Dundee Royal Infirmary and graduated MD from the University of Edinburgh in 1967 with a thesis on vestibular function. After six years in Dundee he returned to the US to gain further experience, this time at West Virginia University becoming a Fellow of the American College of Surgeons in 1975. He returned to a consultant post in Edinburgh where he helped develop the ENT department which had relocated from the Royal Infirmary of Edinburgh in Lauriston Place to the City Hospital.

In collaboration with Professor Philip Stell of Liverpool, he established training courses for head and neck surgery and together they wrote Head and Neck Surgery a textbook which became very popular and ran to several editions.

In the 1980s he developed techniques of endoscopic sinus surgery at that time a novel area of minimally invasive surgery. and in the 1990s to the pathology and treatment of voice disorders He was Professor of Otolaryngology at the University of Edinburgh from 1988 to 2000.

He developed an interest in voice disorders in the later years of his career and the Edinburgh Voice Centre, which he founded jointly with Colin Watson, an opera singer and recording engineer. The clinic acquired an international reputation.

Maran has been described as "one of the world's leading medical experts on the voice". His clients included performers at the Edinburgh festival, and international figures, including Saddam Hussein. Maran wrote in 2005 “Colin built a computer to measure the voice, and I used an endoscope with a keyhole camera to see the vocal cords. The software checks to see if the vocal cord muscles are being used properly, or if there are minor abnormalities. Gradually, it became known in the singing world that there was a peculiar duo in Edinburgh, one of whom knew every singing role, and the other who had these toys to measure it all. Stars started coming from all over Europe.” He believed that professional singers and actors required specialised medical care in much the same way as professional athletes. Maran earned the nickname "The Voice Doctor" and used this monniker as the tile of his book on the history and physiology of singing,

During his career he published over 200 papers in peer reviewed journals. In retirement he published a history of the Mafia and an account of a game of golf which he played at the North Pole, a story interspersed with tales of Arctic explorers.

== Honours and awards ==
Maran was elected president of the Medico-Chirurgical Society of Edinburgh, of the Scottish Otolaryngological Society (now ENT Scotland), and of the laryngology section of the Royal Society of Medicine. He won several prizes including the Walter Jobson Home Prize of the British Medical Association, the Yearsley Medal of the Royal Society of Medicine, the professional Medal of Helsinki, the WJ Harrison Prize, the Semon Medal of the University of London, and the Leon Goldman Medal of South Africa. In 2004 he was awarded an honorary degree of D.Sc. by the University of Hong Kong. He had served the Royal College of Surgeons of Edinburgh as honorary secretary and treasurer and In 1997 he was elected President of the Royal College of Surgeons of Edinburgh.

== Selected publications ==
- Logan Turner's Diseases of the Nose, Throat and Ear 10th Edition (1987) Butterworth-Heinemann ISBN 9781483183640
- Head and Neck Surgery (1972) Heinemann, ISBN 0433315709 with Phili[p Stell
- Republished as Stell & Maran's Textbook of Head and Neck Surgery and Oncology, Fifth Edition (2012) CRC Press; ISBN 978-0-340-92916-2 John Watkinson and Ralph W Gilbert
- The Voice Doctor: The Story of Singing, (2006), Book Guild: ISBN 978-1857769159
- Mafia: Inside the Dark Heart, (2008), Mainstream: ISBN 978-1845964573
- Golf at the North Pole: The Arctic and the Ancient Game, (2013), Upfront: ISBN 9781780357041

== Personal life ==
In 1962, he married Anna De Marco, a physiotherapist working at the Royal Infirmary of Edinburgh. They had two children: Nicola, an anaesthetist; and Charlie, a dentist.

Outside medicine, his interests included music and curling .He was a keen golfer and a member of both the Royal and Ancient Golf Club of St Andrews and of Bruntsfield Links Golfing Society, Edinburgh. He continued to play the piano throughout life and as an enthusiastic jazz pianist played in several amateur groups. He was a member of the Magic Circle and of The Monks of St Giles, an organisation devoted to poetry composition and recital.

Arnold Maran died in Edinburgh on 10 December 2017, aged 81.
