= Claire Hopkins =

British ENT specialist and rhinologist

Claire Hopkins FRCS
- Education: University of Oxford (DM)
- Scientific career
- Fields: Otorhinolaryngology
- Workplaces: Guy's Hospital; King's College, London
- Thesis: Understanding outcome variation in sinonasal surgery (2004)
- Website: www.londonbridgehospital.com/LBH/consultant-det/miss-claire-hopkins

Claire Hopkins is a British Ear, Nose & Throat (ENT) surgeon at Guy's Hospital and Professor of Rhinology at King's College London. She is the President of the British Rhinological Society. During the COVID-19 pandemic, Hopkins successfully campaigned to have anosmia recognised as a symptom of COVID-19 in the United Kingdom.

== Early life and education ==
Hopkins studied physiology and medicine at the University of Oxford and gained her Doctor of Medicine (DM) degree in 2004. Whilst at Oxford, Hopkins was awarded the Martin Wronker Prize for Medicine. She trained in otorhinolaryngology at Guy's and St Thomas' NHS Foundation Trust, where she was appointed a fellow in rhinology. At the start of her career endoscopic sinus surgery was becoming more commonplace. Early in her clinical training Hopkins worked on the National Audit of Sinonasal surgery, with whom she conducted one of the first multi-centre outcome studies in sinus surgery. The study, Sino-Nasal Outcome Test (SNOT) 22, is a patient-reported measure of outcome, and it is now used both nationally and internationally.

== Research and career ==
Hopkins was later appointed a consultant Ear, Nose and Throat (ENT) surgeon at the Guy's and St Thomas' NHS Foundation Trust. Her focus is rhinology, the 'N' of ENT. Speaking about the considerable underrepresentation of women in medicine, Hopkins said, "if I had a pound for every time a patient had asked me (after I examined the patient... and went through the consent process for surgery), 'so will I ever get to meet the Professor Hopkins, is he here?' I would have retired a long time ago,". Hopkins helped to construct international guidelines for the management of nasal polyps. In an interview with Student and Foundation Doctors in Otolaryngology (SFOUK), Hopkins explained that "..the downside of being so specialised is that after a day in outpatients, I sometimes feel as if I am drowning in snot".

Hopkins was made a Professor of Rhinology in 2016. In 2017 Hopkins she gave her inaugural lecture at King's College London, where she discussed her efforts to improve the effectiveness of sinus surgery interventions. In 2019 Hopkins was elected President of the British Rhinological Society.

During the COVID-19 pandemic, Hopkins argued that anosmia (i.e. the loss of sense of smell) should be included in the list of symptoms of COVID-19, and that people who suffer from anosmia should self-isolate. Speaking to the BBC, Hopkins explained that anosmia is a common symptom of COVID-19 in young people, and that it can have a rapid onset without any accompanying blocked nose. In particular, she did not notice significant nasal congestion or rhinorrhea in COVID-19 patients in her own clinical practise. Data from a COVID-19 tracking app developed by King's College London indicated that almost 60% of people who test positive for COVID-19 had lost their sense of smell or taste, which was more than those who had experienced fever. Hopkins said that most people regain their sense of smell within a fortnight. She worked with a group of physicians from across Europe to better understand the sense of smell of COVID-19 positive patients. Together the team were able to show that there is 95% chance that people who experience a sudden loss of smell without any other symptoms would test positive for COVID-19. Working with ENT UK, the United Kingdom's professional body that represents ENT surgeons, and the charity Fifth Sense, Hopkins provided patient advice for people who experience anosmia due to COVID-19.

In April 2020 Hopkins worked with Nirmal Kumar to create a citizen science project (#CovidSmellTest) which asked people to smell household objects and resort their results. In a survey of over 4,000 COVID-19 patients Hopkins and the Global Consortium for Chemosensory Research found that COVID-19 patients experienced an 80% drop in their sense of smell, and almost a 70% drop in their sense of taste. Hopkins was particularly concerned that key workers who continued to work when suffering from anosmia could have been inadvertently spreading COVID-19. In mid May 2020 Hopkins claimed that it was "clinical negligence" for NHS 111 not to recognise anosmia as being a likely symptom of COVID-19. She also emphasised that losing a sense of smell can be so isolating that it causes depression.

On 18 May 2020 the Government of the United Kingdom acknowledged that anosmia was a recognised symptom of COVID-19. Hopkins worked with the British Rhinological Society to create a series of online courses for patients and general practitioners.

=== Selected publications ===
- Hopkins, Claire; Browne, John P.; Slack, Rob; Lund, Valerie; Brown, Peter (2007). "The Lund-Mackay staging system for chronic rhinosinusitis: How is it used and what does it predict?". Otolaryngology–Head and Neck Surgery. 137 (4): 555–561. doi:10.1016/j.otohns.2007.02.004. ISSN 0194-5998. PMID 17903570. S2CID 23417829.
- Hopkins, Claire; Slack, Robert; Lund, Valerie; Brown, Peter; Copley, Lynn; Browne, John (2009). "Long-term outcomes from the English national comparative audit of surgery for nasal polyposis and chronic rhinosinusitis". The Laryngoscope. 119 (12): 2459–2465. doi:10.1002/lary.20653. ISSN 1531-4995. PMID 19780032. S2CID 32083401.
- Hopkins, Claire; Browne, John P.; Slack, Rob; Lund, Valerie J.; Topham, John; Reeves, Barnaby C.; Copley, Lynn P.; Brown, Peter; Meulen, Jan H. P. van der (2006). "Complications of Surgery for Nasal Polyposis and Chronic Rhinosinusitis: The Results of a National Audit in England and Wales". The Laryngoscope. 116 (8): 1494–1499. doi:10.1097/01.mlg.0000230399.24306.50. ISSN 1531-4995. PMID 16885760. S2CID 40635879.

=== Awards and honours ===
Hopkins is a Fellow of the Royal College of Surgeons (FRCS).

== Personal life ==
Hopkins is married with two children.
