= ENT UK =

UK professional body for otorhinolaryngology

ENT UK (sometimes ENT-UK) is the professional body for Otorhinolaryngology ("ear, nose and throat surgery and head, neck and thyroid surgery" in its own words) in the United Kingdom. The British Rhinological Society, British Society of Facial Plastic Surgery (BSFPS), British Society of Otology (BSO) and Head and Neck Society (H&N) are membership groups of ENT UK, and the British Otorhinolaryngology & Allied Sciences Research Society (BOARS) and the British Society for the History of ENT (BSHENT) are special interest groups of ENT UK. The British Laryngological Association (BLA) is "allied to ENT UK".

The journal Clinical Otolaryngology is published by Wiley on behalf of ENT UK and BOARS.

ENT UK is a registered charity, number 1125524, registered in 2008.

== History ==
ENT UK was registered with the Charity Commission for England and Wales in 2008.

In 2012 the ENT UK website bore the statement "ENT UK trading as British Academic Conference in Otolaryngology (BACO) and British Association of Otorhinolaryngology - Head and Neck Surgery (BAO-HNS)". On the same website the name was stylised using a centred dot between "ENT" and "UK": ENT•UK.

The Otorhinolaryngological Research Society (ORS) and the British Society for Academic Otorhinolaryngology (BSAO) merged in 2017 to form BOARS, the British Otorhinolaryngology & Allied Sciences Research Society.

The British Society for the History of ENT grew from a 1981 meeting of a proposed British section of the European Society for the Study of History of Otorhinolaryngology, and became British Society for the History of ENT in 2001, "under the umbrella" of the then British Association of Otolaryngology- Head and Neck Surgery (BAOL-HNS).

The Head and Neck Society was founded in 2009.

The British Society of Otology was founded in 2003.
