= Action on Smoking and Health =

Organizations seeking to reduce harm caused by tobacco smoking

Action on Smoking and Health (ASH) is the name of a number of autonomous pressure groups (charities) in the anglosphere that seek to publicize the risks associated with tobacco smoking and campaign for greater restrictions on use and on cigarette and tobacco sales.

== ASH (United States) ==
Action on Smoking & Health logo name
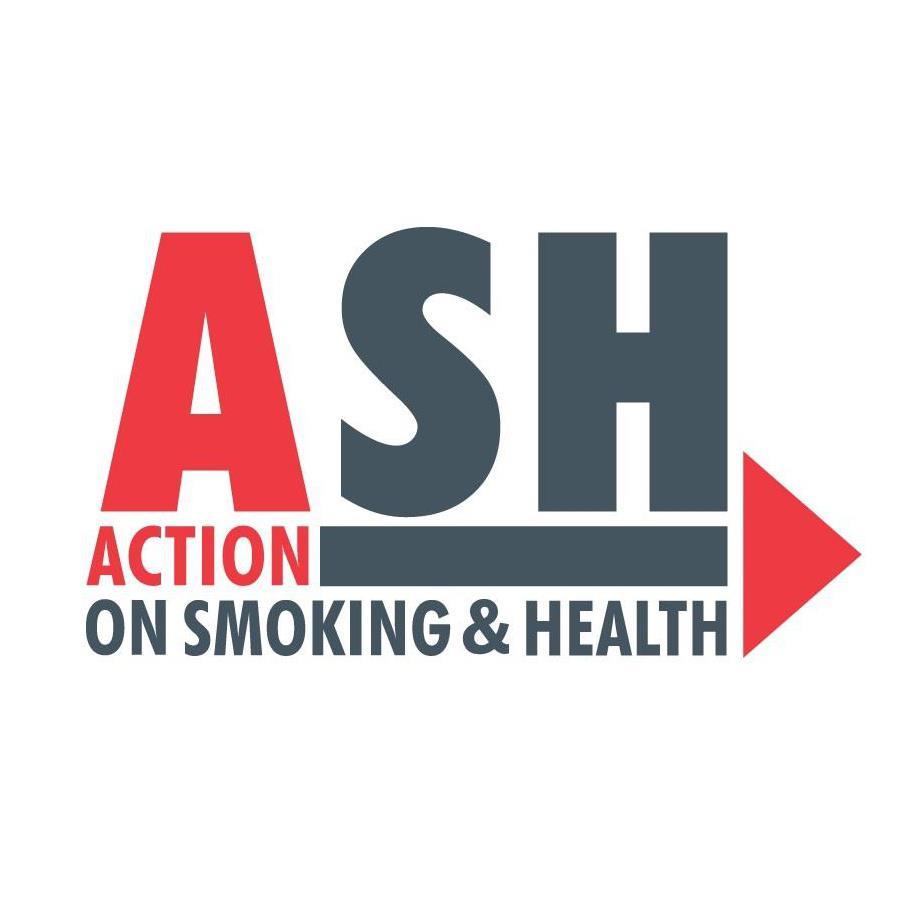
- Abbreviation: ASH
- Founder: Professor John Banzhaf
- Headquarters: Washington, DC United States
- Location: 1250 Connecticut Ave, NW, 7th Fl, Washington, DC 20036
- Board of directors: Dr. Alfred Munzer (chair), Mr. Doug Blanke, Ms. M.R. (Marion) Wells, Mr. Bunyan Bryant, Mr. Stanley Harmon, and Ms. Cheryl Healton
- Key people: Laurent Huber (executive director)
- Website: ash.org

In the US, ASH was formed in 1967 by John F. Banzhaf III, and a distinguished body of physicians, attorneys and other prominent citizens who saw the need for an organization to represent nonsmokers' rights. Since 1967, ASH has taken the lead on a variety of initiatives to counter the deaths, disease, and economic burden imposed by the tobacco industry. Since the release of the original Surgeon General Report on smoking in January 1964, the global initiative for the prevention of tobacco-related damages has made enormous progress—and ASH has played a major role in achieving this progress.

ASH's actions have led to significant progress, including:

- A ban on cigarette commercials over the airwaves in 1971;
- A decision by Congress to ban smoking on airline flights in 1990;
- The implementation of smoke-free legislation in a number of jurisdictions in the United States and other countries;
- A 2001 executive order by President Bill Clinton prohibiting the government from promoting the sale or export of tobacco products;
- Adoption and implementation of the WHO Framework Convention on Tobacco Control (FCTC), by organizing and directing the Framework Convention Alliance, a coalition of more than 500 organizations in over 100 countries advocating for the adoption and implementation of FCTC, the first international treaty that deals exclusively with tobacco issues;
- Inclusion of a tobacco use reduction indicator and the WHO FCTC in the UN Sustainable Development Goals;
- A global discussion and advocacy resources to link tobacco control and human rights.

In April 2024, ASH was one of three nonprofit organisations to file a lawsuit in the federal court in California to enforce the U.S. government to ban menthols. The plaintiffs voluntarily dismissed the case in October 2025.

== ASH (United Kingdom) ==
Action on Smoking and Health
- Abbreviation: ASH
- Formation: 20 January 1971
- Founder: Royal College of Physicians
- Type: Pressure group / Charity
- Registration no.: 262067
- Headquarters: The Foundry 17 Oval Way London SE11 5RR
- Location: London, UK
- Region served: England
- Key people: Hazel Cheeseman (CEO); Prof. Nicholas Hopkinson (chair); Duke of Gloucester (patron)
- Website: ash.org.uk

In the United Kingdom, ASH is a registered charity established in 1971, that aims to eliminate the harm caused by tobacco. It works to raise awareness of the health risks of tobacco, and also campaigns for policy measures. It provides the secretariat of the All-Party Parliamentary Group on smoking and health.

=== History ===
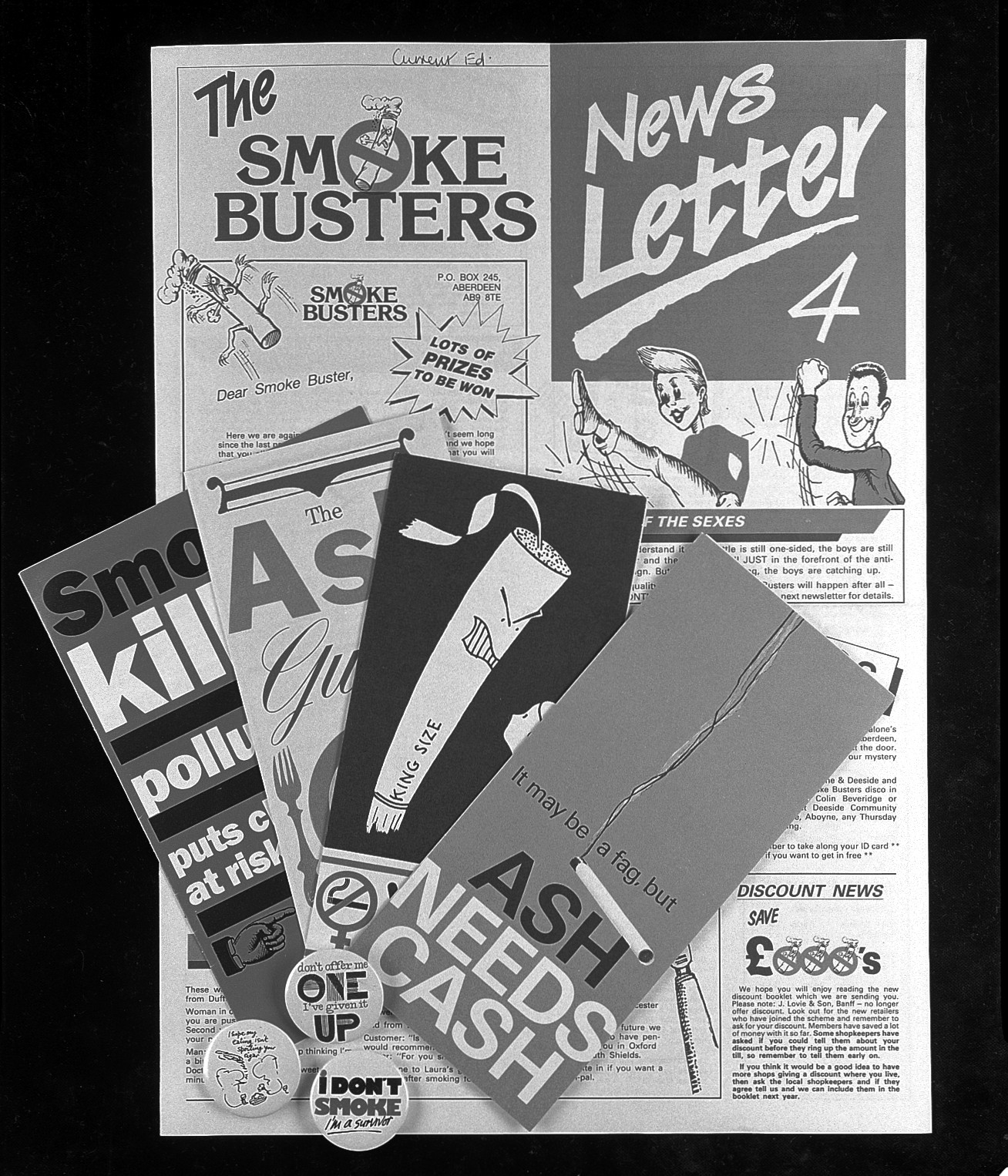
Leaflets and badges from Action on Smoking and Health (ASH)

ASH was established in 1971 by the Royal College of Physicians following the refusal of the UK Government to act on the college's demand for laws to reduce tobacco use. Former health minister, John Dunwoody, became its first director. Its present-day board of trustees reflects its continued support from the medical establishment as it is composed largely of doctors and scientists.

ASH was awarded a WHO World No Tobacco Day Award in May 2011 and the 2012 Luther L Terry Award for "Outstanding Organization" by the American Cancer Society in December 2011.

During the 2023 UN plastics-treaty negotiations in Paris, ASH and other members of the Stop Tobacco Pollution Alliance advocated for the elimination of plastic cigarette filters.

ASH and partner organisations submitted reports to the Committee on the Elimination of Discrimination against Women concerning tobacco and women’s rights in Chile, Canada, Japan and New Zealand in 2024 and Luxembourg in 2025.

Its current chief executive, appointed in 2024, is Hazel Cheeseman. Her predecessor Deborah Arnott won the 2007 Alwyn Smith Prize awarded annually by the UK Faculty of Public Health to the person judged to have made the most outstanding contribution to the health of the public.

=== Funding ===
ASH is a charity describing itself as a "campaigning public health charity that works to eliminate the harm caused by tobacco".

Its funding for its core campaigning programme comes from the British Heart Foundation (BHF) and Cancer Research UK (CRUK). It has also received funding from the Department of Health under its Section 64 grant programme, which is earmarked for specific projects to further the department's public health objectives, and cannot be used to lobby the government.

In 2025, the ASH reported a total income of £913,072 and expenditures of £960,713.

=== Campaigns ===
ASH uses funding from the BHF and CRUK to influence policy on a variety of issues including taxation and smuggling, health inequalities, harm reduction, and smoking and young people. It also works to raise awareness of the methods used by the tobacco industry to influence public health policies. ASH coordinates the Smokefree Action Coalition (SFAC), the umbrella group for organisations working to reduce the harm caused by tobacco, which was set up to campaign for comprehensive smoke-free legislation. As part of its harm-reduction work, ASH has described vaping as less harmful than smoking and as a potential aid for adults attempting to quit, while stating that vapes should not be used by children or people who do not smoke.

In February 2006, ASH won its campaign for legislation which created comprehensive smoke-free indoor workplace regulation, introduced in England on 1 July 2007. The smoke-free regulations included all pubs, bars and private members' clubs, as well as cafés, restaurants, and enclosed workplaces. A similar smoke-free law had already come into force in Scotland in March 2006, and Northern Ireland and Wales followed in April 2007. Campaigning after this point focused on the need for a new government strategy on tobacco control.

In 2008, ten years after the publication of "Smoking Kills", a white paper on tobacco and the first comprehensive strategy to tackle the issue, ASH published "Beyond Smoking Kills" which provided a review of progress on the control of tobacco. The report called for a number of measures including a tobacco display ban, prohibition of the sale of tobacco from vending machines and standardised tobacco packaging.

The Health Act 2009 provides for removal of vending machines for tobacco products (implemented in October 2011) and for the prohibition of the display of tobacco products at the point of sale in England, Wales and Northern Ireland. In March 2011, the Government committed to implement the point of sale legislation in England in large shops from April 2012 and in smaller shops from April 2015. It also committed to a public consultation on standardised packaging in early 2012. ASH, and the SFAC, actively campaigned for the introduction of standardised packaging, which was included in the Children and Families Act 2014 and was passed into law in March 2015. The charity described it as the "most important public health reform of this Parliament."

In 2015, ASH published "Smoking Still Kills" which called for a new government tobacco control strategy, and made a number of recommendations including an annual levy on tobacco companies to fund measures to help smokers quit and prevent youth uptake. At the launch of the report, Parliamentary Under Secretary of State for Public Health Jane Ellison committed to a new tobacco control strategy. Christopher Snowdon, a research fellow at the Institute of Economic Affairs, which had received funding from tobacco firms, noted the influence of the charity saying that the "manifesto of this tiny pressure group is, in effect, the manifesto of whichever party is in power."

In 2021 ASH celebrated its 50th Anniversary with an event at The Royal College of Physicians with speakers including Lord Young of Cookham and Professor Sir Richard Peto,. ASH is also a member of the World Health Organization's Framework Convention Alliance for Tobacco Control.

ASH advocated for the Tobacco and Vapes Act, the first part of which came into effect on 29 April 2026. A generational tobacco sales ban for anyone born after 2008, will be implemented on 1 January 2027. Additionally, it gives the government powers to regulate their packaging, branding, contents and display.

==== Membership ====
ASH covers the whole of the UK and encourages supporters to get involved in the organisation's work, or just lend financial support. ASH coordinates the Smokefree Action Coalition, a group of more than 300 organisations across the United Kingdom. The coalition includes ASH Scotland, ASH Wales and ASH Northern Ireland. Its geographical remit covers England for devolved matters such as health and the United Kingdom as a whole for reserved matters like taxation and illicit tobacco.

=== ASH Scotland ===
ASH Scotland is an independent Scottish charity which aims to take action to reduce the harm caused by tobacco. First founded under the auspices of the Royal College of Physicians of Edinburgh in 1973, ASH Scotland became a wholly separate charity in 1993. ASH Scotland was awarded a WHO World No Tobacco Day Award in 2018.

The organisation seeks to improve health and quality of life by limiting the number of young people taking up smoking, reducing the number of adult smokers, protecting people from second-hand smoke and tackling the inequality resulting from tobacco use. This involves campaigning for change in the law, providing information to politicians, healthcare professionals and the public, and running programmes designed to help people be tobacco-free.

Following ASH Scotland campaigns, Scotland was the first part of the UK to introduce smoke-free public places legislation and the first part of the UK (and the third country globally) to declare a tobacco-free date (2034) as part of the Scottish Government's tobacco control strategy 'Creating a tobacco-free generation'. The Roadmap to create a tobacco-free Scotland by 2034, began in January 2022, and was created by the ASH Scotland together with Public Health Scotland, The Society of Chief Officers of Trading Standards in Scotland (SCOTSS), Cessation coordinators, and academics. The Scottish Government’s 2023 Tobacco and Vaping Framework renewed this national objective.

=== ASH Wales ===
ASH Wales is a smoking cessation and health charity that began in 1976 as an autonomous branch of ASH UK, and later gained independent charity status in 2007. Its aim is to reduce the prevalence of smoking across Wales by identifying and addressing influential factors, increasing public awareness, and improving the quality and reach of cessation services. ASH Wales engages in a variety of projects including campaigning for tobacco-control public-health policy, research, training, educational workshops, advocacy, and support.

==== Campaigns ====
From 2012 onward ASH Wales campaigned for all 22 local authorities in Wales to introduce smoke-free policies in their children's playgrounds. To date, 20 out of 22 local authorities have implemented voluntary bans in their local playgrounds, with another currently in the process of implementing a ban.

ASH Wales played an instrumental role in the Welsh Government's decision to enforce a ban on smoking in cars with children. Smoking in a private vehicle when someone under the age of 18 is present became illegal in England and Wales on 1 October 2015.

==== The Filter Project ====
The Filter is the youth project of ASH Wales which delivers quit smoking support and prevention for children and young people aged 11–25. The Filter provides workshops and quit smoking programmes delivered by smoking cessation advisors.

The Filter Project was launched in 2013 as a result of funding from the Big Lottery Fund. Since then The Filter has delivered its workshops and cessation support to more than 6,000 people across Wales. From 2015 The Filter became part of an Erasmus+ funded partnership bringing together organisations from five different EU countries with the aim of reducing tobacco consumption across all of the nations. This partnership will examine the potential of The Filter to work on a transnational basis. By 2018, The Filter has helped reduce the smoking rate among 15-16 year olds in Wales by 13.5% to 8.5%, it engaged with 12,500 youths at more than 250 events.

==== Wales Tobacco or Health Network ====
The Wales Tobacco or Health Network (WTHN) is a professional network led by ASH Wales for individuals in Wales with an interest in tobacco and its impact on public health. It focuses on smoking and tobacco control but also on wider issues of health and well being such as the links between wealth and health inequality.

The network contains both individuals and organisations with members from many sectors, including academia, the tobacco control community, education, government, healthcare, local government, the media, the NHS, public health, and the private and voluntary sectors.

==== Wales Tobacco Control Alliance ====
The Wales Tobacco Control Alliance (WTCA) is a network managed by ASH Wales to enable all third sector and professional organisations involved with tackling tobacco in Wales to inform and influence policy development and implementation. The WTCA came together to campaign for a comprehensive Tobacco Control Strategy for Wales and now work to monitor this plan and reduce the harm caused by tobacco use more generally. Since 2008 over 30 organisations have joined the WTCA. This includes other charities like Cancer Research UK, the British Heart Foundation, along with professional bodies such as the Royal College of Physicians and the British Medical Association.

Following a campaign by the WTCA the Welsh Government published its Tobacco Control Action Plan in February 2012 which set out a comprehensive strategy containing ambitions to reduce adult smoking prevalence to 16% by 2020.

== ASH (Canada) ==
Founded in 1979, ASH is one of Canada's leading tobacco control organizations.

== ASH (Finland) ==
ASH Finland is a national public-health organisation and tobacco-policy organisation established in 1989. It advocates for a tobacco- and nicotine-free Finland and coordinates the Smoke-free Finland 2030 and Nicotine-free Finland networks.

== ASH Ireland ==
In 1992, ASH Ireland was established by the Irish Heart Foundation and the Irish Cancer Society. ASH Ireland became an official council of the Irish Heart Foundation in 2018, continuing its tobacco control advocacy within that structure.

== ASH (New Zealand) ==
In New Zealand, ASH was formed in 1983. In 2011, the New Zealand Government set a target of making NZ smokefree by 2025. It was a member of the anti-smoking organisation Smokefree Coalition. ASH New Zealand conducts the annual Year 10 Snapshot Survey to assess smoking and vaping behaviour and attitudes among secondary-school students. Results published in the mid-2020s showed that regular vaping had declined after peaking in 2021 among the surveyed students, while daily smoking remained low.

== ASH (Thailand) ==
The ASH in Thailand was founded in 1986 and has been led by Executive Secretary since its founding has been Professor Prakit Vathesatogkit, who is also a member of the National Committee for the Control of Tobacco Use at the Ministry of Public Health of Thailand. Its work has included advocacy for tobacco taxation, restrictions on tobacco advertising and sports sponsorship, public engagement and tobacco-control networks.

== See also ==
- Smoking in the United Kingdom
- List of cigarette smoke carcinogens
- Tobacco control
- Philip Morris v. Uruguay
- FOREST, pro-smoking UK pressure group
