= TB Alert =

British tuberculosis awareness charity

TB Alert is a charity working to raise awareness about and support effective treatment of the disease tuberculosis in the UK and internationally. It was registered in 1998 and launched on World Tuberculosis Day in 1999 in response to the resurgence of tuberculosis (TB) in the UK and worldwide. It is headquartered in Brighton.

== Vision, mission and approach ==
The stated vision of TB Alert is the control and ultimate eradication of TB. Their mission is to increase access to effective treatment for all.

The organisation works towards this by:

- raising awareness of TB
- emphasising the importance of working with people most affected by or vulnerable to TB
- supporting patients to help them complete their treatment
- addressing TB/HIV co-infection
- focusing on building capacity, leadership, responsibility and knowledge of TB within existing community structures
- working with a diverse range of partners including civil society, health care providers, TB clinics and national/regional TB programmes
- providing technical and financial support so that local NGOs and CBOs can integrate TB into their existing programmes
- advocating for greater effort in the fight against TB

== Active projects ==
=== UK projects ===
==== TB Action Group ====
The TB Action Group (TBAG) is a group of people with an interest in promoting awareness of TB in the UK, providing peer support to patients and lobbying for improvements to the existing treatment and support provided by the NHS. Although TB Alert provided funding and administrative support to the group, decisions on its specific activities are taken by its members, who are typically current or former TB patients, or have been affected by the illness of someone close to them.

==== Raising awareness ====
A key element of TB Alert's work in the UK is making medical professionals and the general public aware of the continued existence of tuberculosis in the UK. Examples of their activities in this area include:

- providing leaflets and posters for use in doctors' waiting rooms
- responding to requests for information from the media, patients and medical professionals
- mounting exhibitions
- providing speakers at medical and nursing conferences
- producing detailed leaflets about treatment and clinical issues for use by patients and healthcare professionals

==== Patient support ====
In recognition of the fact that many TB patients come from the poorer sections of society and may find this a barrier to completing treatment, a patient support fund is available to provide small grants. The money can go towards costs such as bus fares to attend appointments or nutritious food to support recovery.

=== India ===
==== TB Alert India ====
TB Alert India is registered separately in India and partnered with TB Alert in the UK. It was founded in 2004. Projects include the establishment of microscopy centres to aid diagnosis, education programmes about TB and the increased risk in conjunction with HIV infection, training DOTS providers and supporting other NGOs with established links to local communities to help raise awareness in those communities. Work is focussed on Andhra Pradesh, which projects also running in Delhi, Bihar, Uttar Pradesh and Madhya Pradesh.

==== Nav Jivan Mission Hospital ====
Nav Jivan Mission Hospital (NJMH) is situated in Palamu District, Jharkhand. With support from TB Alert the hospital has established facilities for the free diagnosis and treatment of TB, serving mainly local subsistence farmers and their families.

=== Zambia ===
==== Bwafwano ====
TB Alert has provided support enabling Bwafwano, a Zambian charity based in Lusaka to train volunteers to provide treatment, support and counselling to patients in their local community. Workshops are also run for community leaders, informing them about TB and HIV and the work that Bwafwano does.

==== Chichetekelo Outreach Partners ====
TB Alert provides funding for this project in the poor Kabwe province, where rates of TB and HIV are high and infection carries a powerful social stigma. Chichetekelo uses adults who have been cured of TB as outreach partners, visiting villages and speaking in centres such as schools or churches about their experience. They address myths and misconceptions surrounding TB and spread the message that TB is a treatable disease.

=== Zimbabwe ===
In Zimbabwe, TB Alert supports the TB services at Murambinda hospital in Buhera District. The hospital is owned by the Sisters of the Little Company of Mary. Recent economic turmoil in Zimbabwe has placed enormous pressure on healthcare services, as well as leaving the population more vulnerable to tuberculosis infection through lack of proper nutrition.

== President and Patrons ==
=== Honorary President ===
Sir John Crofton 1912–2009.

Emeritus Professor of Respiratory Diseases and Tuberculosis, University of Edinburgh Sir John Crofton was knighted in 1977 for his contributions to TB control. As Professor of tuberculosis and respiratory disease in Edinburgh (where TB was the leading cause of death in young people) in the 1950s, Sir John led the team responsible for bringing TB under control in only 6 years – 1/3 of the time predicted. This was the first demonstration of mass control of TB, and his no-nonsense "Edinburgh method" was subsequently instituted in 23 European countries. An indefatigable pioneer and international physician, Sir John has been a leader in the work of the World Health Organization (WHO) and other international bodies, a celebrated author and an influential teacher. The International Union Against Tuberculosis and Lung Disease (IUATLD) awarded Sir John the organisation's highest award, The Union Medal, which recognises outstanding contributions to the control of tuberculosis and lung disease, on October 19, 2005. Never one to slow down, to the end of his life, aged 97, Crofton continued as an inspiring worker in the field of tuberculosis and tobacco control, and fundraising tirelessly on behalf of TB Alert. He will be sadly missed.

=== Patrons ===
Lord (Robert) Kilpatrick of Kincraig, Doctor and past President of the General Medical Council. He was one of the first patients to be treated with streptomycin.

Archbishop Emeritus Desmond Tutu, South African activist and Nobel Peace Prize winner.
