= British Rhinological Society =

The British Rhinological Society is a learned society that encourages education and research in topics related to rhinology, the nose, sinuses and facial plastics. From 2019 to 2022 Claire Hopkins served as the society's president.

The society has approximately 300 members.
