= Rendezvous with God =

Book of interviews on religion

- Author: Shreeja Mohatta Jhawar, Abhilasha Agarwal
- Publication date: 2012

Rendezvous with God is a 2012 book compiled by Shreeja Mohatta Jhawar and Abhilasha Agarwal. It's a collection of interviews with 43 Indian people from different walks of life who share their religious beliefs and experiences of God. The people interviewed include fashion designer Abhishek Dutta, tabla player Bickram Ghosh, musician Shankar Mahadevan, industrialist Sandeep Bhutoria, Ex-NASA scientist Jasvinder Singh, politician Abhishek Manu Singhvi, composer Salim Merchant, Shankar Mahadevan, designer Prasad Bidapa, dance teacher Sandip Soparkar, Past Life Regression Therapist, Dr Trupti Jayin and actress Roopa Ganguly.
