= Framework Convention Alliance =

The Framework Convention Alliance (FCA), also called the Framework Convention Alliance for Tobacco Control, is a confederation of nearly 500 organizations from more than 100 countries which banded together to support the negotiation, ratification and implementation of the World Health Organization (WHO) Framework Convention on Tobacco Control (FCTC). The FCA was formed in 1999 when negotiations began in Geneva.

At first, the organization was a loose group of nongovernmental organizations, universities and others who shared an interest in seeing a strong treaty free from interference from the tobacco industry. Today, the FCA is a nonprofit incorporated in Switzerland with a representative office in Ottawa.

The Board of Directors represents all six World Health Organization regions. Membership is free to any organization which shares FCA's vision for tobacco control.

FCA's vision is a world free from the devastating health, social, economic, and environmental consequences of tobacco and tobacco use. Its mission is to help strengthen the FCTC, support its full and effective implementation worldwide, integrate the FCTC into broader international health and development efforts, and seek novel strategies to free the world from tobacco-caused harms.

In its Strategic Plan, 2014–2017, FCA listed six strategic priorities:

1. Promote and support global health by ensuring the development and implementation of the FCTC, strengthening the FCTC COP processes and encouraging whole-of-government and whole-of-society (excluding the tobacco industry) engagement in FCTC implementation;
2. Further, position the tobacco epidemic as a global public health and development priority and promote the FCTC as the best means to address the epidemic;
3. Mobilise and strengthen global, regional, and national civil society capacity in support of the FCTC;
4. Monitor the implementation of the FCTC;
5. Ensure that the FCTC remains relevant and responsive to global changes that affect tobacco use, in particular, changes in the strategies, tactics and behaviour of tobacco companies;
6. Strengthen FCA's institutional capacity to enable it to meet its strategic priorities.

FCA has consultative status with the United Nations Economic and Social Council (ECOSOC).
