= DNA photolyase =

DNA photolyase may refer to:

- DNA photolyase (protein domain)
- Deoxyribodipyrimidine photo-lyase, an enzyme
- (6-4)DNA photolyase, an enzyme
