= Aziz Sancar =

Turkish biochemist and molecular biologist (born 1946)

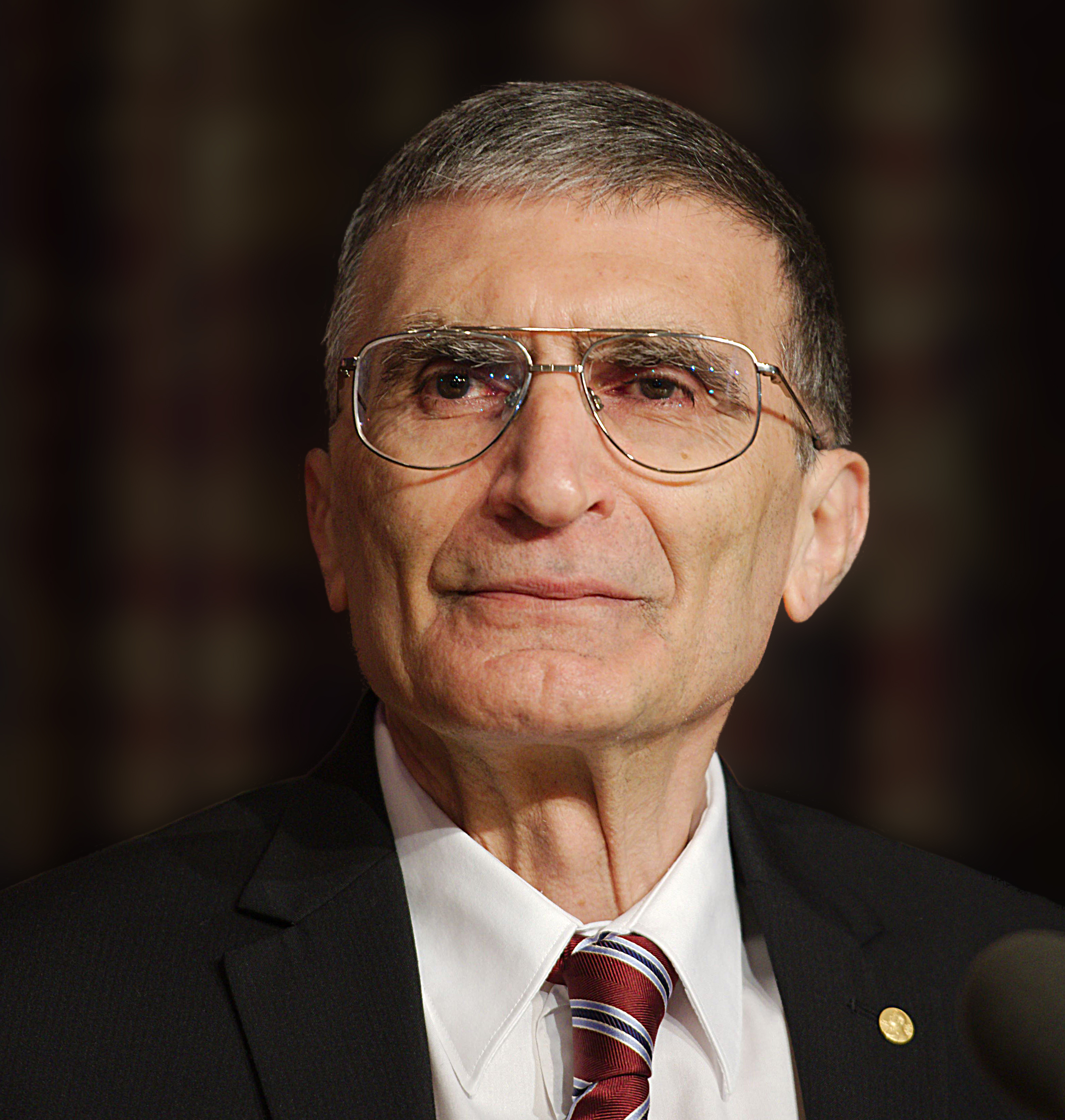
- Sancar in 2015
- Born: 8 September 1946 (age 80); Savur, Mardin, Turkey
- Citizenship: Turkey, United States, TRNC
- Education: Istanbul University (MD); University of Texas at Dallas (PhD)
- Spouses: Gwen Sancar (m. 1978)
- Awards: TÜBİTAK Science Award (1995); Member of the National Academy of Sciences (2005); Vehbi Koç Award (2007); Nobel Prize in Chemistry (2015)
- Scientific career
- Fields: Biochemistry; Molecular biology; DNA repair; Molecular biophysics; Cancer research
- Workplaces: UNC School of Medicine; UNC Lineberger Comprehensive Cancer Center; Yale School of Medicine
- Thesis: A study on photoreactivating enzyme (DNA photolyase) of Escherichia coli (1977)
- Doctoral advisor: Claud Stan Rupert

Aziz Sancar (Turkish: [aˈziz ˈsandʒaɾ]; born 8 September 1946) is a Turkish-American molecular biologist specializing in DNA repair, cell cycle checkpoints, and circadian clock. In 2015, he was awarded the Nobel Prize in Chemistry along with Tomas Lindahl and Paul L. Modrich for their mechanistic studies of DNA repair. He has made contributions on photolyase and nucleotide excision repair in bacteria that have changed his field.

Sancar is currently the Sarah Graham Kenan Professor of Biochemistry and Biophysics at the University of North Carolina School of Medicine and a member of the UNC Lineberger Comprehensive Cancer Center. He is the co-founder of the Aziz & Gwen Sancar Foundation, which is a non-profit organization to promote Turkish culture and to support Turkish students in the United States.

== Early life ==
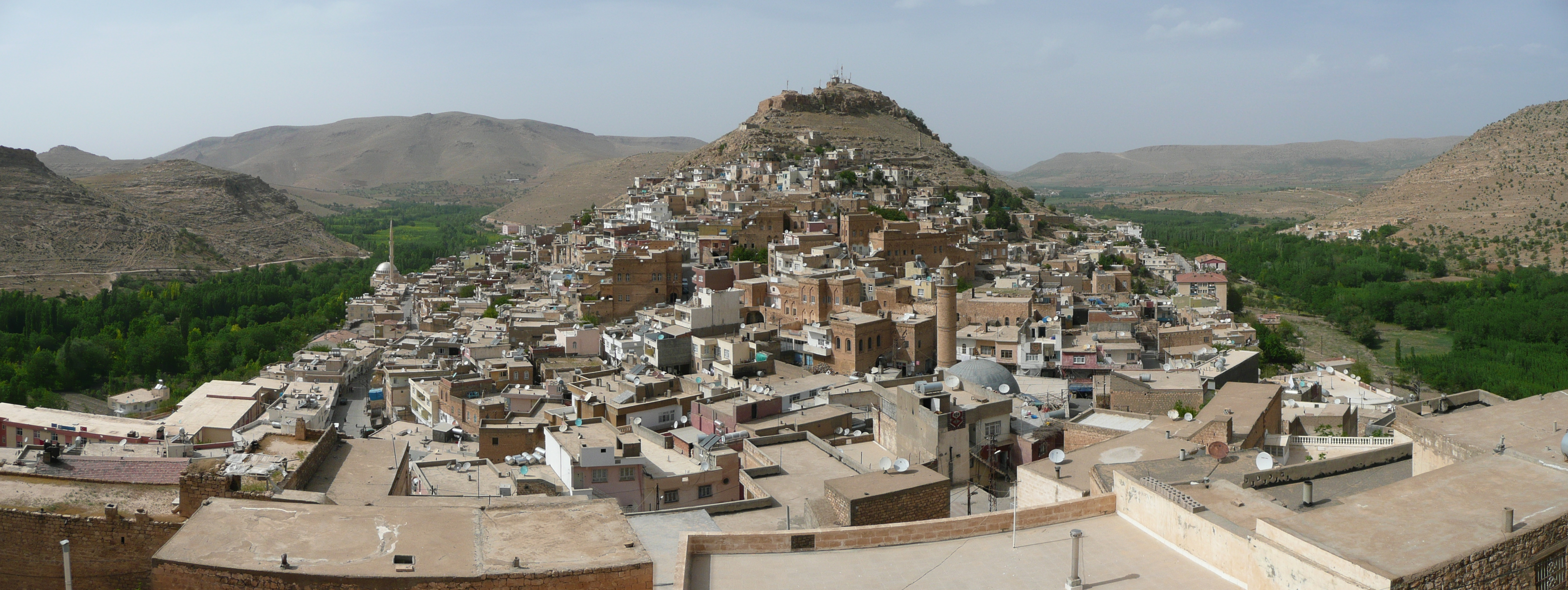
Savur district of Mardin Province, Turkey

Aziz Sancar was born on 8 September 1946 to a lower-middle-class family in the Kurdish-dominated Savur district of Mardin Province, southeastern Turkey. His oldest brother Kenan Sancar is a retired brigadier general in the Turkish Armed Forces. He is the second cousin of the politician Mithat Sancar, who is a member of parliament from and chairman of HDP. He is the seventh of eight children.

His parents were uneducated; however, they put great emphasis on his education. He was educated by idealistic teachers who received their education in the Village Institutes, he later stated that this was a great inspiration to him. Throughout his school life, Sancar had great academic success that was noted by his teachers. He wanted to study chemistry whilst at high school, but was persuaded to study medicine after five of his classmates also got into medicine along with him. As such, he studied medicine at the Faculty of Medicine of Istanbul University.

=== Origins ===
According to his own account, Sancar spoke Arabic with his parents and Turkish with his siblings. When asked about his origins, Sancar only underlined his Turkish nationality and refused to talk about his ancestry. However, his cousin, Mithat Sancar, mentioned that their family is Arab. Mithat Sancar considers Arabic his native language, while Kurdish was the language he spoke on the street.

Sancar later said he was "disturbed by some of the questions he received," particularly by questions about his ethnic background. When asked as to whether he is "a Turk or half-Arab" by the BBC, Aziz Sancar responded: "I told them that I neither speak Arabic nor Kurdish and that I was a Turk," he said. "I'm a Turk, that's it."

During his years at Istanbul University, he was involved with the far-right Turkish ultranationalist organization Grey Wolves, which has been classified as a terrorist group in many countries.

== Education ==
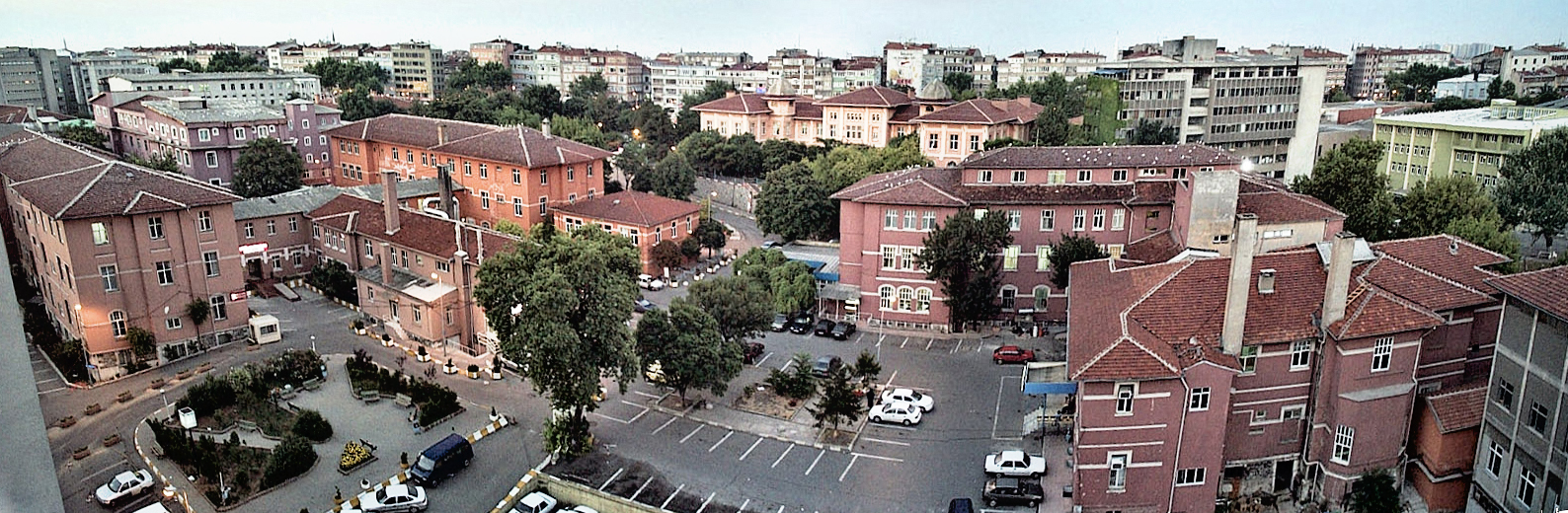
Istanbul University – Faculty of Medicine

Sancar received his primary education near his hometown of Savur. He then completed his MD degree at Istanbul University of Turkey in 1969 and he graduated from school as the top student. He completed his PhD degree on the photoreactivating enzyme of E. coli in 1977 at The University of Texas at Dallas in the laboratory of Claud Stan Rupert, now Professor Emeritus.

== Career ==
Sancar is an honorary member of the Turkish Academy of Sciences and the American Academy of Arts and Sciences.

After graduating from Istanbul University, Sancar returned to Savur. Although he wanted to go to the United States, he was recommended to try out being a doctor, and he worked as a doctor in the region for 1.5 years. He then won a scholarship from TÜBİTAK to pursue further education in biochemistry at Johns Hopkins University, but returned to Savur in 1973 as a doctor after spending 1.5 years there due to having social difficulties and inability to adapt to the American way of life. He only spoke French when he arrived in the US, but learned English during his education at Johns Hopkins.

Soon after, he wrote to Rupert, who had been involved in the discovery of DNA repair and was at Johns Hopkins during Sancar's time there but had since moved to the University of Texas at Dallas. He was accepted and completed his PhD in molecular biology there. His interest had been stimulated by the recovery of bacteria, which had been exposed to deadly amounts of ultraviolet radiation, upon their illumination with blue light. In 1976, as part of his doctoral dissertation, he managed to replicate the gene for photolyase, an enzyme that repairs thymine dimers that result from ultraviolet damage.

After completing his PhD, Sancar had three rejected applications for postdoctoral positions and then took up work at Yale University as a laboratory technician. He worked at Yale for five years. Here, he started his field-changing work on nucleotide excision repair, another DNA mechanism that works in the dark. In the laboratory of Dean Rupp, he elucidated the molecular details of this process, identifying UvrABC endonuclease and the genes that code for it, and furthermore discovering that these enzymes cut twice on the damaged strand of DNA, removing 12–13 nucleotides that include the damaged part.

Following his mechanistic elucidations of nucleotide exchange repair, he was accepted as a lecturer at the University of North Carolina, the only university that he got a positive response from out of the 50 he applied to. He has stated that his accent of English was detrimental to his career as a lecturer. At Chapel Hill, Sancar discovered the following steps of nucleotide excision repair in bacteria and worked on the more complex version of this repair mechanism in humans.

His longest-running study has involved photolyase and the mechanisms of photo-reactivation. In his inaugural article in the PNAS, Sancar captured the photolyase radicals he has chased for nearly 20 years, thus providing direct observation of the photocycle for thymine dimer repair.

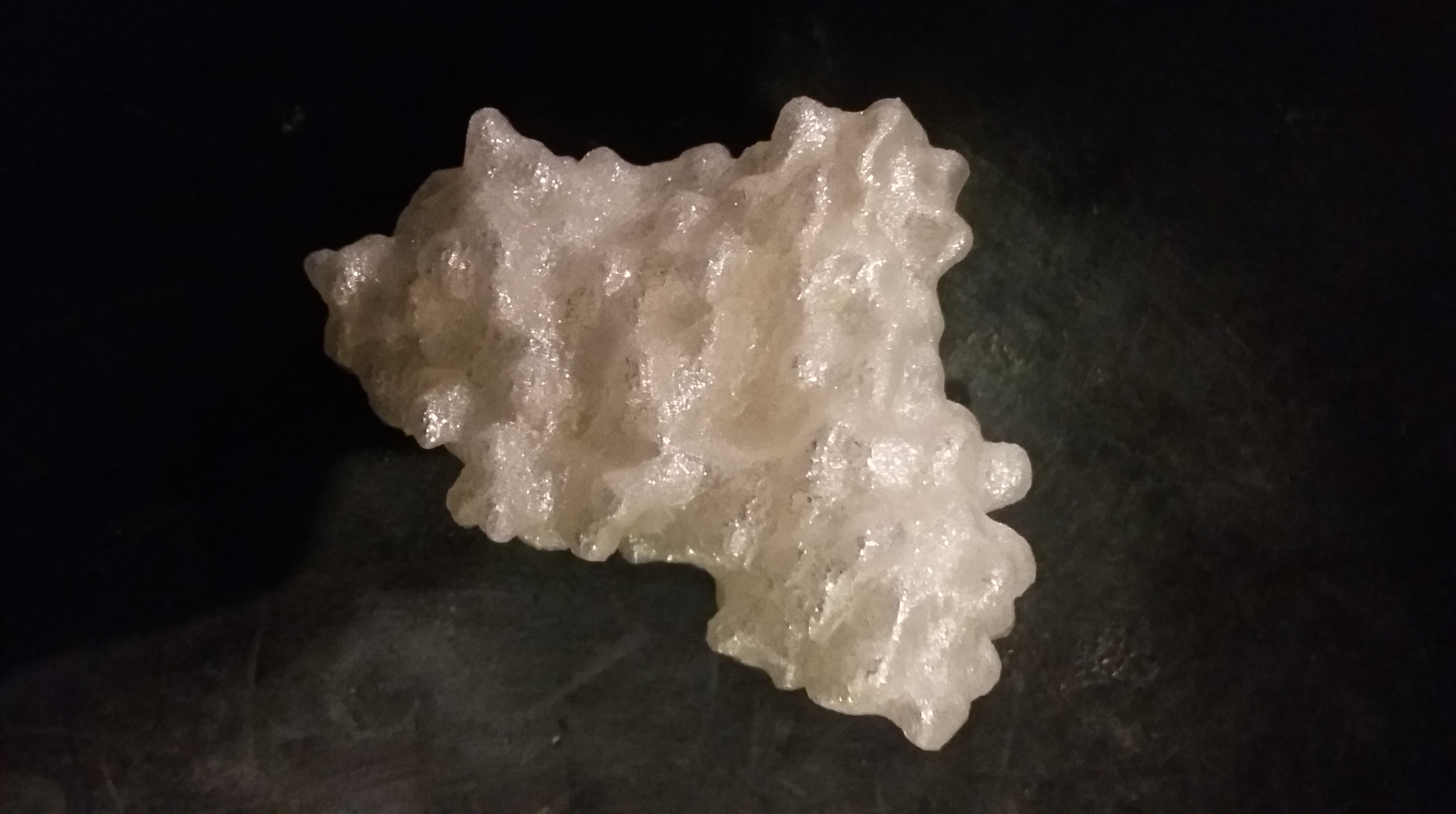
Model of Photolyase based on 1QNF

Aziz Sancar was elected to the National Academy of Sciences in 2005 as the first Turkish member. He is the Sarah Graham Kenan Professor of Biochemistry, at the University of North Carolina at Chapel Hill. He is married to Gwen Boles Sancar, who graduated the same year and who is also a professor of Biochemistry and Biophysics at the University of North Carolina at Chapel Hill. Together, they founded Carolina Türk Evi, a permanent Turkish Center in close proximity to the campus of UNC-CH, which provides graduate housing for four Turkish researchers at UNC-CH, short term guest services for Turkish visiting scholars, and a center for promoting Turkish-American interchange.

== Research on circadian clock ==
Sancar and his research team have discovered that two genes, Period and Cryptochrome, keep the circadian clocks of all human cells in proper rhythm, syncing them to the 24 hours of the day and seasons. Their findings were published in the Genes and Development journal on September 16, 2014. Sancar's research has provided a complete understanding of the workings of Circadian clocks in humans, which may be used to treat a wide range of different illnesses and disorders such as jet-lag and seasonal affective disorder, and may be useful in controlling and optimizing various cancer treatments.

== Personal life ==
Sancar is married to Gwen Boles Sancar, whom he met during his PhD in Dallas, where she was also studying molecular biology. They got married in 1978.

Sancar is a practicing Muslim. In an interview, he stated: "I am proud to be Muslim, but I can not state this fact in many regions of the United States due to ongoing issues." In the immediate aftermath of being awarded the Nobel Prize, his ethnicity was questioned in social media.

In an interview, Sancar stated that in his youth, he was an idealist but he didn't participate in activities. In another interview, Sancar stated that he supports moderate Pan-Turkism. On September 26, 2021, Sancar was the honorary guest of the Turkic Council on occasion of the meeting of the foreign secretaries from member states and has given a presentation titled "Knowledge and the National Awakening of the Turkic World", as announced by Turkish Minister of Foreign Affairs Mevlüt Çavuşoğlu.

On 31 July 2025, Sancar was granted naturalised citizenship of the Turkish Republic of Northern Cyprus.

== Awards ==
He was awarded the 2015 Nobel Prize in Chemistry along with Tomas Lindahl and Paul L. Modrich for their mechanistic studies of DNA repair. He was granted Presidential Young Investigator Award from the National Science Foundation in Molecular Biophysics in 1984. Sancar is the second Turkish Nobel laureate after Orhan Pamuk, who is also an alumnus of Istanbul University.

Aziz Sancar donated his original Nobel Prize golden medal and certificate to the mausoleum of Mustafa Kemal Atatürk, with a presidential ceremony on 19 May 2016, which is the 97th anniversary of Atatürk initiating the Turkish War of Independence. He delivered a replica of his Nobel medal and certificate to Istanbul University, from which he earned his MD.

On January 19, 2025, during a ceremony held at the Sancar Cultural Center in the state of North Carolina, USA, TÜRKSOY General Secretary Sultan Raev presented Sancar with the Order of Cultural Ambassador of the Turkic World.
