= (R)-2-hydroxyacid dehydrogenase =

Class of enzymes

Identifiers
- EC no.: 1.1.1.272

Databases
- IntEnz: IntEnz view
- BRENDA: BRENDA entry
- ExPASy: NiceZyme view
- KEGG: KEGG entry
- MetaCyc: metabolic pathway
- PRIAM: profile
- PDB structures: RCSB PDB PDBe PDBsum
- Gene Ontology: AmiGO / QuickGO
Search
- PMC: articles
- PubMed: articles
- NCBI: proteins

In enzymology, a (R)-2-hydroxyacid dehydrogenase (EC 1.1.1.272) is an enzyme that catalyzes the chemical reaction

(2R)-3-sulfolactate + NAD(P)^{+} $\rightleftharpoons$ 3-sulfopyruvate + NAD(P)H + H^{+}

The 3 substrates of this enzyme are (2R)-3-sulfolactic acid, NAD^{+}, and NADP^{+}, whereas its 4 products are 3-sulfopyruvic acid, NADH, NADPH, and H^{+}. This enzyme is important in the metabolism of archaea, particularly their biosynthesis of coenzymes such as coenzyme M, tetrahydromethanopterin and methanofuran.

This enzyme belongs to the family of oxidoreductases, specifically those acting on the CH-OH group of donor with NAD^{+} or NADP^{+} as acceptor. The systematic name of this enzyme class is (R)-2-hydroxyacid:NAD(P)^{+} oxidoreductase. Other names in common use include (R)-sulfolactate:NAD(P)^{+} oxidoreductase, L-sulfolactate dehydrogenase, ComC, and (R)-sulfolactate dehydrogenase.

== Structural studies ==
As of late 2007, only one structure has been solved for this class of enzymes, with the PDB accession code 1RFM.
