= CofE-AF =

CofE-AF may refer to:

- Coenzyme F420-0:L-glutamate ligase, an enzyme
- Coenzyme F420-1:gamma-L-glutamate ligase, an enzyme
