= Cofe =

Cofe may refer to:

- Church of England
- Council of Europe
- Conference on the Future of Europe
- Coenzyme F420-0:L-glutamate ligase, an enzyme
- Coenzyme F420-1:gamma-L-glutamate ligase, an enzyme
