= Tetrahydromethanopterin =

Names
- IUPAC name (2S)-2-[[(2R,3S,4R,5S)-5-[(2R,3S,4S)-5-[4-[[(1R)-1-[(6S,7S)-2-amino-7-methyl-4-oxo-5,6,7,8-tetrahydro-1H-pteridin-6-yl]ethyl]amino]phenyl]-2,3,4-trihydroxypentoxy]-3,4-dihydroxyoxolan-2-yl]methoxy-hydroxyphosphoryl]oxypentanedioic acid

Identifiers
CAS Number	92481-94-2
3D model (JSmol)	Interactive image
ChEBI	CHEBI:17321
ChemSpider	4573696
KEGG	C01217
PubChem CID	5462234
CompTox Dashboard (EPA)	DTXSID70919150
- InChI: InChI=1S/C30H45N6O16P/c1-12(21-13(2)33-26-22(34-21)27(44)36-30(31)35-26)32-15-5-3-14(4-6-15)9-16(37)23(41)17(38)10-49-29-25(43)24(42)19(51-29)11-50-53(47,48)52-18(28(45)46)7-8-20(39)40/h3-6,12-13,16-19,21,23-25,29,32,34,37-38,41-43H,7-11H2,1-2H3,(H,39,40)(H,45,46)(H,47,48)(H4,31,33,35,36,44)/t12-,13+,16+,17-,18+,19-,21?,23+,24-,25-,29+/m1/s1 Key: SCBIBGUJSMHIAI-FDLOOEGASA-N; InChI=1/C30H45N6O16P/c1-12(21-13(2)33-26-22(34-21)27(44)36-30(31)35-26)32-15-5-3-14(4-6-15)9-16(37)23(41)17(38)10-49-29-25(43)24(42)19(51-29)11-50-53(47,48)52-18(28(45)46)7-8-20(39)40/h3-6,12-13,16-19,21,23-25,29,32,34,37-38,41-43H,7-11H2,1-2H3,(H,39,40)(H,45,46)(H,47,48)(H4,31,33,35,36,44)/t12-,13+,16+,17-,18+,19-,21?,23+,24-,25-,29+/m1/s1 Key: SCBIBGUJSMHIAI-FDLOOEGABF
- SMILES: O=C2/N=C(/N)NC=1N[C@@H](C)C(NC=12)[C@H](Nc3ccc(cc3)C[C@H](O)[C@H](O)[C@H](O)CO[C@H]4O[C@@H]([C@@H](O)[C@H]4O)COP(=O)(O[C@H](C(=O)O)CCC(=O)O)O)C

Properties
Chemical formula	C_{30}H_{45}N_{6}O_{16}P
Molar mass	776.682661
- Except where otherwise noted, data are given for materials in their standard state (at 25 °C [77 °F], 100 kPa). verify (what is ?) Infobox references

5,6,7,8-Tetrahydromethanopterin (THMPT, H_{4}MPT) is a coenzyme in methanogenesis. It is the carrier of the C1 group as it is reduced to the methyl level, before transferring to the coenzyme M.

== Structure ==
The structure of H_{4}MPT is analogous to that of tetrahydrofolate (THFA, H_{4}folate). Both share a core derived from dihydropteroate (H_{2}Pte), but where H_{4}folate acid has a glutamyl tail attached to the 1' carbonyl group of H_{2}Pte, H_{4}MPT instead has a "a ribitol residue linked to ribose 5-phosphate and thence to hydroxyglutarate". The pteroate part also sees two additional chiral methyl groups: carbon #12 on the branch connecting it to the phenyl ring (position 11, corresponds to folate position 9) and carbon #13 on the pterin core (position 7 in both MPT and folate).

The lack of a electron-withdrawing carbonyl group para to N^{10} increases the electron density at this 10-position. The pKa for this atom in H_{4}MPT is -1.2, compared to +2.4 for H_{4}folate. The biochemical redox potential E^{'}_{0} is more negative in reactions that involve one-carbon units bound to this atom. In contrast, the chemical environment of N^{5} is largely unchanged as far as enthalpy is concerned. This difference has the effects including but not limited to:

- Methenyl-THMPT (CH^{+}-H_{4}MPT) is more difficult to reduce than methenyl-THFA (CH^{+}-H_{4}folate). Reduction is effected by a so-called iron-sulfur cluster free hydrogenase. The cumbersome name distinguishes this hydrogenase from the other hydrogenases that do contain Fe-S cluster. Steric hinderince from the 11-methyl group may also play a role.
- The methylene of CH_{2}-H_{4}MPT exchanges more slowly with the formyl from formaldehyde compared to the analogous CH_{2}-H_{4}folate reaction. The epimerization of this methylene is also slower.
- Formyl (HCO)-H_{4}MPT is thermodynamically able to spontaneously cyclize to CH_{2}-H_{4}MPT, unlike the folate analogos which requires energy input from ATP.
- Unlike in THF where the formyl group attaches to position 10, the formyl group attaches to position 5 on THMPT.

=== Biosynthesis ===
Steps in the biosynthesis of methanopetrin include:

Biosynthesis of methanopetrin
Substrates	Products	Enzyme	EC number	Gene names	Notes
GTP + H_{2}O	7,8-dihydro-D-neopterin 2′,3′-cyclic phosphate (H_{2}Npt-cP) + HCOOH + pyrophosphate	GTP cyclohydrolase IV	3.5.4.39	MptA	New type of GTP cyclohydrolase in 2007.
H_{2}Npt-cP + H_{2}O	7,8-dihydro-D-neopterin (2′ or 3′) phosphate (H_{2}Npt-P)	H_{2}Npt-cP phosphodiesterase	3.1.4.56	MptB	IUBMB reports a in vitro product ratio of 4:1 for 2' vs 3'.
4-aminobenzoate (PABA) + PRPP	Beta-ribofuranosylphenol 5'-phosphate (β-RFA-P) + PPi + CO_{2}	β-RFA-P synthase	2.4.2.54	MptG	
β-RFA-P + H_{2}Npt-3'-P	7,8-dihydropterin-6-yl-methyl-4-((β-)D-ribofuranosyl)aminobenzene 5'-phosphate + PPi	(H_{2}Pte-6-yl)-RFA-P synthase	2.5.1.105	MJ0301	A MptH/MJ0107 was originally proposed for this activity due to similarity to dihydropteroate synthase. However, lab testing reveals the Metallo-beta-lactamase protein fold MJ0301 to be actually responsible.
(H_{2}Pte-6-yl)-RFA-P + 2 H_{2}O?	N-[(7,8-dihydropterin-6-yl)methyl]-4-(1-deoxy-d-ribulosyl)aminobenzene + Pi + ?	Unidentified lyase	-.-.-.-	Unk	Unidentified ring-opening reaction that turns the closed ribose ring (ribofuranosyl) into an open ribulose chain ((H_{2}Pte-6-yl)-RA).
(H_{2}Pte-6-yl)-RA + PRPP	(1-(4-{N-[(7,8-dihydropterin-6-yl)methyl]amino}phenyl)-5-(5-phospho-α-d-ribulosyl)-1-deoxyribitol + PPi	Unidentified ((H_{2}Pte-6-yl)-RA)-PRPP synthase	-.-.-.-	Unk	Unidentified condensation reaction.
((H_{2}Pte-6-yl)-RA)-PRPP + α-Ketoglutaric acid (AKG)	7,11-dinor-H_{2}MPT + H_{2}O + PPi	Also unidentified	-.-.-.-	Unk	"7,11-dinor" refers to the lack of two methyl groups compared to dihydromethanopterin. See nor-.
7,11-dinor-H_{2}MPT + 2 AdoMet + ?	H_{2}MPT + 2 AdoHcy + ?	Unidentified methyltransferases	-.-.-.-	Unk	Position 11 is methylated first, based on observation of variant molecules. MJ0619 is a candidate gene.
H_{2}MPT + 2 NAD(P)H + 2 H^{+}	H_{4}MPT + 2 NAD(P)^{+}	dihydromethanopterin reductase or acceptor variant	1.5.1.47	dmrA	KEGG R03388, bacterial. Characterized 2004. Prefers NADPH.
H_{2}MPT + reduced acceptor	H_{4}MPT + acceptor	dihydromethanopterin reductase (acceptor)	1.5.99.15	dmrX	KEGG R10802, archaeal. Characterized 2014. Likely uses a flavin acceptor.

=== Variations ===
There are numerous variations on H_{4}MPT in archaea (bacteria tend to stick to the standard molecule):

- Pyrococcus and Thermococcus have a poly-β3(l→4)-linked N-acetylglucosamine side chain instead of the hydroxyglutamic acid terminus. There can be 1–5 units.
- In (tetrahydro)sarcinapterin (H_{4}SPT), a glutamyl group is linked to the 2-hydroxyglutaric acid terminus of MPT. This reaction is mediated by EC 6.3.2.33 tetrahydrosarcinapterin synthase.
- (H_{4})tatiopterin-0 differs from H_{4}SPT by the lack of 7-methylation. Tatiopterin-1 has one more glutamyl group attached to the α carboxyl of the additional glutamyl.
- (H_{4})thermopterin differs from tatiopterin-0 by the addition of an electron-withdrawing phenyl group in the 3' position, ortho to the pterin part and meta to the ribulose chain.
- (H_{4})sulfopterin of Sulfolobus has neither methyl group. The molecule has only been characterized to the ribulose, with the rest being unknown.

== Biochemical function ==
=== One-carbon carrier ===
N-Formylmethanofuran donates the C^{1} group to the N^{5} site of the pterin to give the 5-formyl-THMPT (5-CHO-H_{4}MPT). (This is different from THF, which tends to give 10-formyl-THF. The difference is due to the aforementioned local chemical difference.) The formyl group subsequently condenses intramolecularly to give 5,10-methenyl-THMPT^{+} (5,10-CH^{+}-H_{4}MPT), which is then reduced to 5,10-methylene-THMPT (5,10-CH_{2}-H_{4}MPT) by 5,10-methenyl-THMPT^{+} hydrogenase with H_{2} as the electron donor. 5,10-Methylene-MPT is subsequently converted, using coenzyme F_{420} as the electron source, to methyl-THMPT (5-CH_{3}-H_{4}MPT), catalyzed by F_{420}-dependent methylene-THMPT reductase. 5-Methyl-THMPT is the methyl donor to coenzyme M, a conversion mediated by methyl-THMPT: coenzyme M methyltransferase.

Like THF, the C1 transformations of THMPT can lead to acetyl-CoA as well as convert glycine to serine. It does not feed into purine metabolism, glycine production, or ketoglutarate production, however.

Evidence for MPT participation in methionine synthesis is weak (as of 2000). Further genetic work has not identified a methyl-THMPT-using methionine synthase (though the split-MetE versions remain candidates) but has instead found many that use a corrinoid protein to carry the methyl group. In methanogens with the MesA synthase, the methyl group likely comes from the aforementioned methyl-THMPT: coenzyme M methyltransferase, so ultimately these organisms do obtain their methyl from methyl-THMPT.

How (and whether) MPT relates to thymidylate biosynthesis is also unclear. Cell-free extracts of various archaea are able to convert dUMP to dTMP when given MPT (or sulfopterin fragments, in the case of Sulfolobus) and isotope-labeled formaldehyde, but no enzyme has been identified.

=== C2 ===
N^{5},N^{10}-(1,1-ethylene)H_{4}MPT (5,10-ethylene-H_{4}MPT) and N^{5}-ethyl-H_{4}MPT have been detected in Methanothermobacter marburgensis, indicating that H_{4}MPT can also serve as a two-carbon carrier. Under standard conditions, H_{4}MPT spontaneously reacts with acetaldehyde to yield ethylene-H_{4}MPT. M. marburgensis lysate contains an enzyme that catalyzes this product's reduction to ethyl-H_{4}MPT.
