= 8-Hydroxy-5-deazaflavin:NADPH oxidoreductase =

Class of enzymes

8-hydroxy-5-deazaflavin:NADPH oxidoreductase

Identifiers
- EC no.: 1.5.1.40

Databases
- IntEnz: IntEnz view
- BRENDA: BRENDA entry
- ExPASy: NiceZyme view
- KEGG: KEGG entry
- MetaCyc: metabolic pathway
- PRIAM: profile
- PDB structures: RCSB PDB PDBe PDBsum
Search
- PMC: articles
- PubMed: articles
- NCBI: proteins

8-Hydroxy-5-deazaflavin:NADPH oxidoreductase (EC 1.5.1.40, 8-OH-5dFl:NADPH oxidoreductase) is an enzyme with systematic name reduced coenzyme F420:NADP^{+} oxidoreductase. This enzyme catalyses the following chemical reaction

reduced coenzyme F420 + NADP^{+} $\rightleftharpoons$ coenzyme F420 + NADPH + H^{+}

The enzyme requires the 5-deazaflavin structure, as well as an 8-hydroxy group in the substrate.
