= Coenzyme F420 =

Chemical compound

Names
- IUPAC name (2S)-2-[[(4S)-4-carboxy-4-[[(2S)-2-[hydroxy-[(2R,3S,4S)-2,3,4-trihydroxy-5-(2,4,8-trioxo-1H-pyrimido[4,5-b]quinolin-10-yl)pentoxy]phosphoryl]oxypropanoyl]amino]butanoyl]amino]pentanedioic acid
- Other names Coenzyme F(420); F_{420}

Identifiers
CAS Number	64885-97-8
3D model (JSmol)	Interactive image
ChEBI	CHEBI:16848
ChemSpider	110515
DrugBank	DB03913
ECHA InfoCard	100.110.762
EC Number	613-724-2
KEGG	C00876
PubChem CID	123996
- InChI: InChI=1S/C29H36N5O18P/c1-12(25(42)31-17(28(46)47)4-6-21(38)30-16(27(44)45)5-7-22(39)40)52-53(49,50)51-11-20(37)23(41)19(36)10-34-18-9-14(35)3-2-13(18)8-15-24(34)32-29(48)33-26(15)43/h2-3,8-9,12,16-17,19-20,23,36-37,41H,4-7,10-11H2,1H3,(H,30,38)(H,31,42)(H,39,40)(H,44,45)(H,46,47)(H,49,50)(H2,32,33,43,48)/t12-,16-,17-,19-,20+,23-/m0/s1 Key: XXFFZHQKSZLLIT-NALJQGANSA-N
- SMILES: C[C@@H](C(=O)N[C@@H](CCC(=O)N[C@@H](CCC(=O)O)C(=O)O)C(=O)O)OP(=O)(O)OC[C@H]([C@H]([C@H](CN1C2=CC(=O)C=CC2=CC3=C1NC(=O)NC3=O)O)O)O

Properties
Chemical formula	C_{29}H_{36}N_{5}O_{18}P
Molar mass	773.598 g·mol^{−1}
- Except where otherwise noted, data are given for materials in their standard state (at 25 °C [77 °F], 100 kPa). Infobox references

Coenzyme F_{420} is a family of coenzymes involved in redox reactions in a number of bacteria and archaea. It is derived from coenzyme F_{O} (7,8-didemethyl-8-hydroxy-5-deazariboflavin) and differs by having a oligoglutamyl tail attached via a 2-phospho-L-lactate bridge. F_{420} is so named because it is a flavin derivative with an absorption maximum at 420 nm.

F_{420} was originally discovered in methanogenic archaea and in Actinomycetota (especially in Mycobacterium). It is now known to be used also by Cyanobacteria and by soil Proteobacteria, Chloroflexi and Firmicutes. Eukaryotes including the fruit fly Drosophila melanogaster and the algae Ostreococcus tauri also use Coenzyme F_{O}.

F_{420} is structurally similar to FMN, but catalytically it is similar to NAD and NADP: it has low redox potential and always transfers a hydride. As a result, it is not only a versatile cofactor in biochemical reactions, but also being eyed for potential as an industrial catalyst. Similar to FMN, it has two states: one reduced state, notated as F_{420}-H_{2}, and one oxidized state, written as just F_{420}. F_{O} has largely similar redox properties, but cannot carry an electric charge and as a result probably slowly leaks out of the cellular membrane.

A number of F_{420} molecules, differing by the length of the oligoglutamyl tail, are possible; F_{420}-2, for example, refers to the version with two glutamyl units attached. Lengths from 4 to 9 are typical.

== Biosynthesis ==
Coenzyme F_{420} is synthesized via a multi-step pathway:

- 7,8-didemethyl-8-hydroxy-5-deazariboflavin synthase (FbiC) produces Coenzyme FO (also written F0), itself a cofactor of DNA photolyase (antenna). This is the head portion of the molecule.
- 2-phospho-L-lactate transferase (FbiA) produces Coenzyme F_{420}-0, the portion containing the head, the diphosphate bridge, and ending with a carboxylic acid group.
- Coenzyme F420-0:L-glutamate ligase (one part of FbiB) puts a glutamate residue at the -COOH end, producing Coenzyme F_{420}-1.
- Coenzyme F420-1:gamma-L-glutamate ligase (other part of FbiB) puts a gamma-glutamate residue at the -COOH end, producing Coenzyme F_{420}-2, the final compound (in its oxidized form). Also responsible for adding additional units.

Oxidized F_{420} can be converted to reduced F_{420}-H_{2} by multiple enzymes such as Glucose-6-phosphate dehydrogenase (coenzyme-F420) (Fgd1).

== Function ==
The coenzyme is a substrate for coenzyme F_{420} hydrogenase, 5,10-methylenetetrahydromethanopterin reductase and methylenetetrahydromethanopterin dehydrogenase.

A long list of other enzymes use F_{420} to oxidize (dehydrogenate) or F_{420}-H_{2} to reduce substrates.

F420 plays a central role in redox reactions across diverse organisms, including archaea and bacteria, by participating in methanogenesis, antibiotic biosynthesis, DNA repair and the activation of antitubercular drugs. Its ability to carry out hydride transfer reactions is enabled by its low redox potential, which is optimized for specific biochemical pathway.

== Clinical relevance ==
Delamanid, a drug used to treat multi-drug-resistant tuberculosis (MDRTB) in combination with other antituberculosis medications, is activated in the mycobacterium by deazaflavin-dependent nitroreductase (Ddn), an enzyme which uses dihydro-F_{420} (reduced form). The activated form of the drug is highly reactive and attacks cell wall synthesis enzymes such as DprE2. Pretomanid works in the same way. Clinical isolates resistant to these two drugs tend to have mutations in the biosynthetic pathway for F_{420}.

== See also ==
- Coenzyme M
- Coenzyme B
- Methanofuran
- Tetrahydromethanopterin
