= Mycolic acid =

Long fatty acids found in the cell walls of the Mycobacteriales taxon

Mycolic acids are long fatty acids found in the cell walls of Mycobacteriales taxon, a group of bacteria that includes Mycobacterium tuberculosis, the causative agent of the disease tuberculosis. They form the major component of the cell wall of many Mycobacteriales species. Despite their name, mycolic acids have no biological link to fungi; the name arises from the filamentous appearance their presence gives Mycobacteriales under high magnification. The presence of mycolic acids in the cell wall also gives Mycobacteriales a distinct gross morphological trait known as "cording". Mycolic acids were first isolated by Stodola et al. in 1938 from an extract of M. tuberculosis.

Mycolic acids are composed of a longer beta-hydroxy chain with a shorter alpha-alkyl side chain. Each molecule contains between 60 and 90 carbon atoms. The exact number of carbons varies by species and can be used as an identification aid. Most mycolic acids also contain various functional groups.

== Mycolic acids of M. tuberculosis ==
Mycolic acids in Mycobacterium tuberculosis.

M. tuberculosis produces three main types of mycolic acids: alpha-, methoxy-, and keto-. Alpha-mycolic acids make up at least 70% of the mycolic acids of the organism and contain several cyclopropane rings. Methoxy-mycolic acids, which contain several methoxy groups, constitute between 10% and 15% of the mycolic acids in the organism. The remaining 10% to 15% of the mycolic acids are keto-mycolic acids, which contain several ketone groups.

Mycolic acids impart M. tuberculosis with unique properties that defy medical treatment. They make the organism more resistant to chemical damage and dehydration, and limit the effectiveness of hydrophilic antibiotics and biocides. Mycolic acids also allow the bacterium to grow inside macrophages, effectively hiding it from the host immune system. Mycolate biosynthesis is crucial for survival and pathogenesis of M. tuberculosis. The pathway and enzymes have been elucidated and reported in detail. Five distinct stages are involved. These were summarised as follows:

- Synthesis of the C26 saturated straight chain fatty acids by the enzyme fatty acid synthase-I (FAS-I) to provide the α-alkyl branch of the mycolic acids;
- Synthesis of the C56 fatty acids by FAS-II providing the meromycolate backbone;
- Introduction of functional groups to the meromycolate chain by numerous cyclopropane synthases;
- Condensation reaction catalysed by the polyketide synthase Pks13 between the α-branch and the meromycolate chain before a final reduction by the enzyme corynebacterineae mycolate reductase A (CmrA) to generate the mycolic acid; and
- Transfer of mycolic acids to arabinogalactan and other acceptors such as trehalose via the antigen 85 complex

The fatty acid synthase-I and fatty acid synthase-II pathways producing mycolic acids are linked by the beta-ketoacyl-(acyl-carrier-protein) synthase III enzyme, often designated as mtFabH. Novel inhibitors of this enzyme could potentially be used as therapeutic agents.

The mycolic acids show interesting inflammation controlling properties. A clear tolerogenic response was promoted by natural mycolic acids in experimental asthma. The natural extracts are however chemically heterogeneous and inflammatory. By organic synthesis, the different homologues from the natural mixture could be obtained in pure form and tested for biological activity. One subclass proved to be a very good suppressor of asthma, through a totally new mode of action. These compounds are now under further investigation. A second subclass triggered a cellular immune response (Th1 and Th17), so studies are ongoing to use this subclass as an adjuvant for vaccination.

The exact structure of mycolic acids appears to be closely linked to the virulence of the organism, as modification of the functional groups of the molecule can lead to an attenuation of growth in vivo. Further, individuals with mutations in genes responsible for mycolic acid synthesis exhibit altered cording.

== Clinical relevance ==
An international multi-centre study has proved that delamanid (OPC-67683), a new agent derived from the nitro-dihydro-imidazooxazole class of compounds that inhibits mycolic acid synthesis, can increase the rate of sputum culture conversion in multi-drug-resistant tuberculosis (MDRTB) at 2 months.

== Beyond M. tuberculosis ==
Mycolic acids with different sizes and chemical modifications are found throughout Mycobacteriales.

=== Mycobacterium ===
Most attention have been traditionally devoted to the mycolic acids of Mycobacterium species, which display great variation in length and modifications. Modifications not seen in M. tuberculosis include:

- Double bonds (cis and trans), in M. smegmatis (with a branch from UmaA1) and M. alvei
- ω-1 methoxy, in M. alvei
- trans-epoxy group, in M. smegmatis
- Wax ester in S or cis position, in M. avium

=== Rhodococcus ===
The mycolic acids of members of the genus Rhodococcus differ in several ways from those of M. tuberculosis. They contain no functional groups, but instead may have several unsaturated bonds. Two different profiles of Rhodococcus mycolic acids exist. The first has between 28 and 46 carbon atoms with either 0 or 1 unsaturated bonds. The second has between 34 and 54 carbon atoms with between 0 and 4 unsaturated bonds. Sutcliffe (1998) has proposed that they are linked to the rest of the cell wall by arabinogalactan molecules.
