= Formylmethanofuran dehydrogenase =

formylmethanofuran dehydrogenase

Identifiers
- EC no.: 1.2.7.12
- CAS no.: 119940-12-4

Databases
- BRENDA: enzyme data
- ExPASy: NiceZyme view
- KEGG: enzyme entry
- MetaCyc: metabolic pathway
- Rhea: reactions
- PDB structures: RCSB PDB PDBe PDBsum
- Gene Ontology: AmiGO / QuickGO
Search
- PMC: articles
- PubMed: articles
- NCBI: proteins

In enzymology, a formylmethanofuran dehydrogenase (EC 1.2.7.12) is an enzyme that catalyzes the chemical reaction:

formylmethanofuran + H_{2}O + acceptor $\rightleftharpoons$ CO_{2} + methanofuran + reduced acceptor.

The 3 substrates of this enzyme are formylmethanofuran, H_{2}O, and acceptor, whereas its 3 products are CO_{2}, methanofuran, and reduced acceptor.

This enzyme belongs to the family of oxidoreductases, specifically those acting on the aldehyde or oxo group of donor with other acceptors. The systematic name of this enzyme class is formylmethanofuran:acceptor oxidoreductase. This enzyme is also called formylmethanofuran:(acceptor) oxidoreductase. This enzyme participates in folate biosynthesis. It has 2 cofactors: molybdenum, and Pterin.

== Discovery and biological occurrence ==
Formylmethanofuran (formyl-MFR) dehydrogenase is found in methanogenic archaea which are capable of synthesizing methane using substrates such as carbon dioxide, formate, methanol, methylamines, and acetate.

In 1967, a reliable technique for the mass culture of hydrogen and carbon dioxide was developed for methanogens. As kilogram scale of cell was developed and utilized for biochemical studies, it became obvious that coenzymes are involved in biochemistry of methanogens. Methanobacterium thermoautotrophicum's reduction of carbon dioxide (CO_{2}) with hydrogen is the most studied system.

Methanobacterium thermoautotrophicum's metabolism involves almost all of the reactions in methanogenesis. Molybdenum and tungsten containing formyl-MFR was isolated from M. thermoautotrophicum when proteins were purified from soluble cofactors-depleted cell extracts. It was not known to have existed prior to this experiment. MFR was required to generate methane from CO_{2} insoluble cofactors-depleted cell extracts. Formyl-MFR dehydrogenase was also isolated from Methanosarcina barkeri and Archaeoglobus fulgidus cell extracts. Molybdenum-containing formyl-MFR dehydrogenase was isolated from Methanothermobacter wolfeii.

== Structure ==
In 2016, the X-ray structure of formylmethanofuran dehydrogenase was determined. Formyl-MFR contains two heterohexamers FwdABCDFG which are protein subunits which associate as a symmetric dimer in a C_{2} rotational symmetry. The formyl-MFR dehydrogenase also contains 23 and 46 iron-sulfur cubane clusters in the dimer and tetramer forms respectively. The subunit FwdA contains two zinc atoms analogous to dihydroorotase. It also contains N6-carboxylysine, zinc ligands, and an aspartate that is crucial to catalysis. Meanwhile, the subunit FwdF is composed of four T-shaped ferrodoxin domains that are similar. The T-shaped iron-sulfur clusters in the FwdF subunit link up to form a path from the outside edge to the inside core. FwdBD has a redox-active tungsten.

The tungsten in FwdBD is coordinated by four dithiolene thiolates. Six sulfurs from the thiolate of Cys^{118} and an organic sulfide ligand coordinate to the tungsten of tungstopterin at the active site of FwdB. The tungsten is coordinated in a distorted octahedral geometry. A carbon dioxide (CO_{2}) suitable binding site is occupied by the solvent in the X-ray structure of the crystal not in vivo. The binding site lies between Cys^{118}, His^{119}, Arg^{228}, and sulfur-tungsten ligand.

== Methanogenesis catalysis ==
Formyl-MFR dehydrogenase catalyzes the methanogenesis reaction by reducing carbon dioxide (CO_{2}) to form carboxy-MFR. The structural data obtained from the X-ray structure suggests that carbon dioxide (CO_{2}) is reduced to formate (E_{0}’ = -430 mV) at FwdBD's tungstopterin active site to carboxy-MFR by a 4Fe-4S ferredoxin (E = ~ – 500 mV) located 12.4 Å away. Then, it reduces the carboxy-MFR to MFR at its tungsten or molybdenum active site.

=== Proposed mechanism ===
A 43 Å long hydrophilic tunnel supports the proposed two-step scenario of CO_{2} reduction and fixation. This hydrophilic tunnel is located in the middle of FwdBD and FwdA active sites and is convenient for formic acid and formate transportation [pKa = 3.75]. The tunnel has a bottleneck appearance which consists of a narrow passage and a wide solvent-filled cavity located at the front of each active site. Arg^{228} of FwdBD and Lys^{64} of FwdA control gate operation at the bottlenecks. Two [4Fe-4S] cluster chain's outer cluster in the branched outer arm of the FwdF subunits funnels electrons to the tungsten center. Then, carbon dioxide is reduced to formate (while tungsten is oxidized: tungsten oxidation state goes from +4 to +6) when carbon dioxide enters the catalytic compartment through FwdBD's hydrophobic tunnel. Formic acid or formate diffuses to the FwdA's active site via a hydrophilic tunnel. Once it is diffused at the active site, it is condense at the binuclear zinc center with MFR. Pumping formate into the tunnel is proposed to attain exergonic reduction of CO_{2} to formate with reduced ferredoxin.
