= Tetrahydromethanopterin S-methyltransferase =

tetrahydromethanopterin S-methyltransferase

Identifiers
- EC no.: 7.2.1.4
- CAS no.: 103406-60-6

Databases
- IntEnz: IntEnz view
- BRENDA: BRENDA entry
- ExPASy: NiceZyme view
- KEGG: KEGG entry
- MetaCyc: metabolic pathway
- PRIAM: profile
- PDB structures: RCSB PDB PDBe PDBsum
- Gene Ontology: AmiGO / QuickGO
Search
- PMC: articles
- PubMed: articles
- NCBI: proteins

In enzymology, a tetrahydromethanopterin S-methyltransferase (EC 7.2.1.4) is an enzyme that catalyzes the chemical reaction

5-methyl-5,6,7,8-tetrahydromethanopterin + 2-mercaptoethanesulfonate $\rightleftharpoons$ 5,6,7,8-tetrahydromethanopterin + 2-(methylthio)ethanesulfonate

Thus, the two substrates of this enzyme are 5-methyl-5,6,7,8-tetrahydromethanopterin and 2-mercaptoethanesulfonate (coenzyme M), whereas its two products are 5,6,7,8-tetrahydromethanopterin and 2-(methylthio)ethanesulfonate.

This enzyme belongs to the family of transferases, specifically those transferring one-carbon group methyltransferases. The systematic name of this enzyme class is 5-methyl-5,6,7,8-tetrahydromethanopterin:2-mercaptoethanesulfonate 2-methyltransferase. This enzyme is also called tetrahydromethanopterin methyltransferase. This enzyme participates in folate biosynthesis.
