= Glucose-6-phosphate dehydrogenase (coenzyme-F420) =

Identifiers
- EC no.: 1.1.98.2

Databases
- IntEnz: IntEnz view
- BRENDA: BRENDA entry
- ExPASy: NiceZyme view
- KEGG: KEGG entry
- MetaCyc: metabolic pathway
- PRIAM: profile
- PDB structures: RCSB PDB PDBe PDBsum
Search
- PMC: articles
- PubMed: articles
- NCBI: proteins

Glucose-6-phosphate dehydrogenase (coenzyme-F420) (EC 1.1.98.2, coenzyme F420-dependent glucose-6-phosphate dehydrogenase, F420-dependent glucose-6-phosphate dehydrogenase, FGD1, Rv0407, F420-dependent glucose-6-phosphate dehydrogenase 1) is an enzyme with systematic name D-glucose-6-phosphate:F420 1-oxidoreductase. This enzyme catalyses the following chemical reaction

Glucose 6-phosphonic acid
+ oxidized
coenzyme F420
6-Phosphogluconolactone
+ reduced
coenzyme F420

Thus enzyme is specific for D-glucose 6-phosphate.
