= Coenzyme F420 hydrogenase =

Class of enzymes

coenzyme F420 hydrogenase

Identifiers
- EC no.: 1.12.98.1
- CAS no.: 9027-05-8

Databases
- IntEnz: IntEnz view
- BRENDA: BRENDA entry
- ExPASy: NiceZyme view
- KEGG: KEGG entry
- MetaCyc: metabolic pathway
- PRIAM: profile
- PDB structures: RCSB PDB PDBe PDBsum
- Gene Ontology: AmiGO / QuickGO
Search
- PMC: articles
- PubMed: articles
- NCBI: proteins

In enzymology, a coenzyme F420 hydrogenase (EC 1.12.98.1) is an enzyme that catalyzes the chemical reaction

H_{2} + coenzyme F_{420} $\rightleftharpoons$ reduced coenzyme F_{420}

Thus, the two substrates of this enzyme are H_{2} and coenzyme F420, whereas its product is reduced coenzyme F420.

This enzyme belongs to the family of oxidoreductases, specifically those acting on hydrogen as donor with other, known, acceptors. The systematic name of this enzyme class is hydrogen:coenzyme F420 oxidoreductase. Other names in common use include 8-hydroxy-5-deazaflavin-reducing hydrogenase, F420-reducing hydrogenase, and coenzyme F420-dependent hydrogenase. This enzyme participates in folate biosynthesis and is a critical part of energy conservation in some methanogens such as Methanosarcina barkeri. It has 3 cofactors: iron, nickel, and deazaflavin.
