= Tetrahydrosarcinapterin synthase =

Class of enzymes

Identifiers
- EC no.: 6.3.2.33

Databases
- IntEnz: IntEnz view
- BRENDA: BRENDA entry
- ExPASy: NiceZyme view
- KEGG: KEGG entry
- MetaCyc: metabolic pathway
- PRIAM: profile
- PDB structures: RCSB PDB PDBe PDBsum
Search
- PMC: articles
- PubMed: articles
- NCBI: proteins

Tetrahydrosarcinapterin synthase (EC 6.3.2.33, H4MPT:alpha-L-glutamate ligase, MJ0620, MptN protein) is an enzyme with systematic name tetrahydromethanopterin:alpha-L-glutamate ligase (ADP-forming). This enzyme catalyses the following chemical reaction

ATP + tetrahydromethanopterin + L-glutamate $\rightleftharpoons$ ADP + phosphate + 5,6,7,8-tetrahydrosarcinapterin

This enzyme catalyses the biosynthesis of 5,6,7,8-tetrahydrosarcinapterin.
