= Methylenetetrahydromethanopterin dehydrogenase =

methylenetetrahydromethanopterin dehydrogenase

Identifiers
- EC no.: 1.5.98.1
- CAS no.: 100357-01-5

Databases
- IntEnz: IntEnz view
- BRENDA: BRENDA entry
- ExPASy: NiceZyme view
- KEGG: KEGG entry
- MetaCyc: metabolic pathway
- PRIAM: profile
- PDB structures: RCSB PDB PDBe PDBsum
- Gene Ontology: AmiGO / QuickGO
Search
- PMC: articles
- PubMed: articles
- NCBI: proteins

In enzymology, a methylenetetrahydromethanopterin dehydrogenase (EC 1.5.98.1) is an enzyme that catalyzes the chemical reaction

5,10-methylenetetrahydromethanopterin + coenzyme F_{420} $\rightleftharpoons$ 5,10-methenyltetrahydromethanopterin + reduced coenzyme F_{420}

Thus, the two substrates of this enzyme are 5,10-methylenetetrahydromethanopterin and coenzyme F420, whereas its two products are 5,10-methenyltetrahydromethanopterin and reduced coenzyme F420.

This enzyme belongs to the family of oxidoreductases, specifically those acting on the CH-NH group of donors with other acceptors. The systematic name of this enzyme class is 5,10-methylenetetrahydromethanopterin:coenzyme-F420 oxidoreductase. Other names in common use include N5,N10-methylenetetrahydromethanopterin dehydrogenase, and 5,10-methylenetetrahydromethanopterin dehydrogenase. This enzyme participates in folate biosynthesis.

== Structural studies ==
As of late 2007, 4 structures have been solved for this class of enzymes, with PDB accession codes 1QV9, 1U6I, 1U6J, and 1U6K.
