= TB Alliance =

Medical non-profit for tuberculosis

The Global Alliance for TB Drug Development
- Abbreviation: TB Alliance
- Established: February 2000; 26 years ago
- Type: Nonprofit
- Legal status: Active
- Headquarters: New York City, Pretoria
- Chief Executive Officer: Mel Spigelman
- Website: www.tballiance.org

TB Alliance (formally The Global Alliance for TB Drug Development) is a not-for-profit product development partnership (PDP) dedicated to the discovery and development of new, faster-acting and affordable tuberculosis (TB) medicines. Since its inception in 2000, TB Alliance has worked to grow the field of available treatments for TB and now manages the largest pipeline of new TB drugs in history. It was founded in Cape Town, South Africa, and has since expanded. It is headquartered in New York City and has a regional office in Pretoria.

== Background ==
Tuberculosis is the leading cause of infectious death worldwide, killing approximately 1.6 million people each year. However, research and development for new TB drugs came to a virtual standstill after the 1960s. Today, a four-drug combination therapy exists, but it takes six months or more to be effective. This requires a degree of monitoring (See Direct Observational Therapy, Short-course) beyond the capacity of the health infrastructure in many countries, and adequate TB treatment is not available to more than half of the most infectious cases. This can inhibit control of the disease and fuel the rise of drug resistance (See antimicrobial resistance).

About 29% of deaths caused by antimicrobial infections today are due to drug-resistant TB. When infections become resistant to first-line drugs, more expensive therapies must be used to treat them. Lengthier treatment, often in hospitals, substantially increases health care costs as well as the economic burden on families and societies. The cost of treating a single case of multidrug-resistant TB (MDR-TB) or extensively drug-resistant TB (XDR-TB) can be thousands of times more expensive than treating drug-sensitive TB.

TB is also the number one killer of people with AIDS, but it is generally agreed that current TB treatments do not work well with the antiretroviral drugs used to treat HIV. New, improved TB treatments are urgently needed. However, the TB drug market lacks sufficient financial incentives to stimulate broad-based investment from pharmaceutical companies to invest in the new research required to sustain a treatment pipeline. The TB epidemic is concentrated in developing countries where drugs must be low in cost to remain accessible. It does not generate the kind of revenue streams that private companies usually deem necessary to justify the research costs and strategic risks involved in pharmaceuticals. TB Alliance was designed to be the primary instrument to fill this vacuum and to ensure that new anti-TB drugs are affordable and accessible in endemic countries.

== History ==
TB Alliance was conceived at a February 2000 meeting in Cape Town, South Africa, where 120 representatives from academia, industry, major government agencies, non-governmental organizations and donors gathered to discuss the problems of tuberculosis treatment. Participants stressed the need for faster-acting, novel TB drugs and highlighted the scientific opportunities involved. The resulting "Declaration of Cape Town" provided a road map for TB drug development and outlined the need for creation of the TB Alliance. Maria Freire was appointed as the first chief executive officer and President in 2001 and served in that capacity until 2008, when she left the TB Alliance to become President of the Lasker Foundation. The current CEO and President is Melvin Spigelman.

== Program ==
TB Alliance is a non-profit product development partnership (See public-private partnership). A PDP builds partnerships between the public, private, academic and philanthropic sectors to drive the development of new products for underserved markets. PDPs retain direct management oversight of their projects, though much of the laboratory and clinical work is done though external research facilities and contractors. This model minimizes costs, including overhead and investments in infrastructure, while optimizing scientific capability to speed new TB drug development.

TB Alliance has the largest pipeline of TB drugs in history and part of TB Alliance's stated mission is to ensure that any new treatments are affordable and accessible in the developing world, and that they are adopted as soon as they become available. Pricing terms are included in all licensing contracts and end products are designed to be easy for patients to take. TB Alliance also collaborates with national and international partners, working to ensure that new therapies are adopted and accessible to healthcare providers and patients via local channels.

In February 2019, TB Alliance's application for the novel tuberculosis (TB) medicine pretomanid was accepted for review by the U.S. FDA. In August 2019, TB Alliance's tuberculosis (TB) medicine pretomanid was approved by the U.S. FDA, to be used in combination with two other antibiotics, bedaquiline and linezolid, for the treatment of extensively drug-resistant (XDR) TB as well as treatment-intolerant or nonresponsive multidrug-resistant (MDR) TB.

== Treating drug-resistant TB ==
Combination therapies are essential for treating active tuberculosis infections. Currently, there are four first-line tuberculosis drugs given as a combination therapy over an extended period of time. Some strains of the tuberculosis pathogen are resistant to two (called MDR-TB) or at least four (called XDR-TB) first-line tuberculosis drugs. Due to the contagious nature of tuberculosis, drug resistance is considered to be a serious public health issue, particularly among people with an already weakened immune system, for example people living with HIV.

== Donors ==
The TB Alliance has a diverse set of global partnerships with both public and private sector donors that fund the company's work. The organization operates with the support of:

- Australia Department of Foreign Affairs and Trade
- Bill & Melinda Gates Foundation
- Germany's Federal Ministry of Education and Research through KfW
- Global Health Innovative Technology (GHIT) Fund
- Indonesia Health Fund
- Irish Aid
- Medical Research Council (United Kingdom)
- National Institute of Allergy and Infectious Disease
- Netherlands Ministry of Foreign Affairs
- UK Department of International Development (DFID)
- UK Department of Health
- United States Agency for International Development (USAID)
