= Maria Freire =

American health executive and life-sciences leader

Maria C. Freire
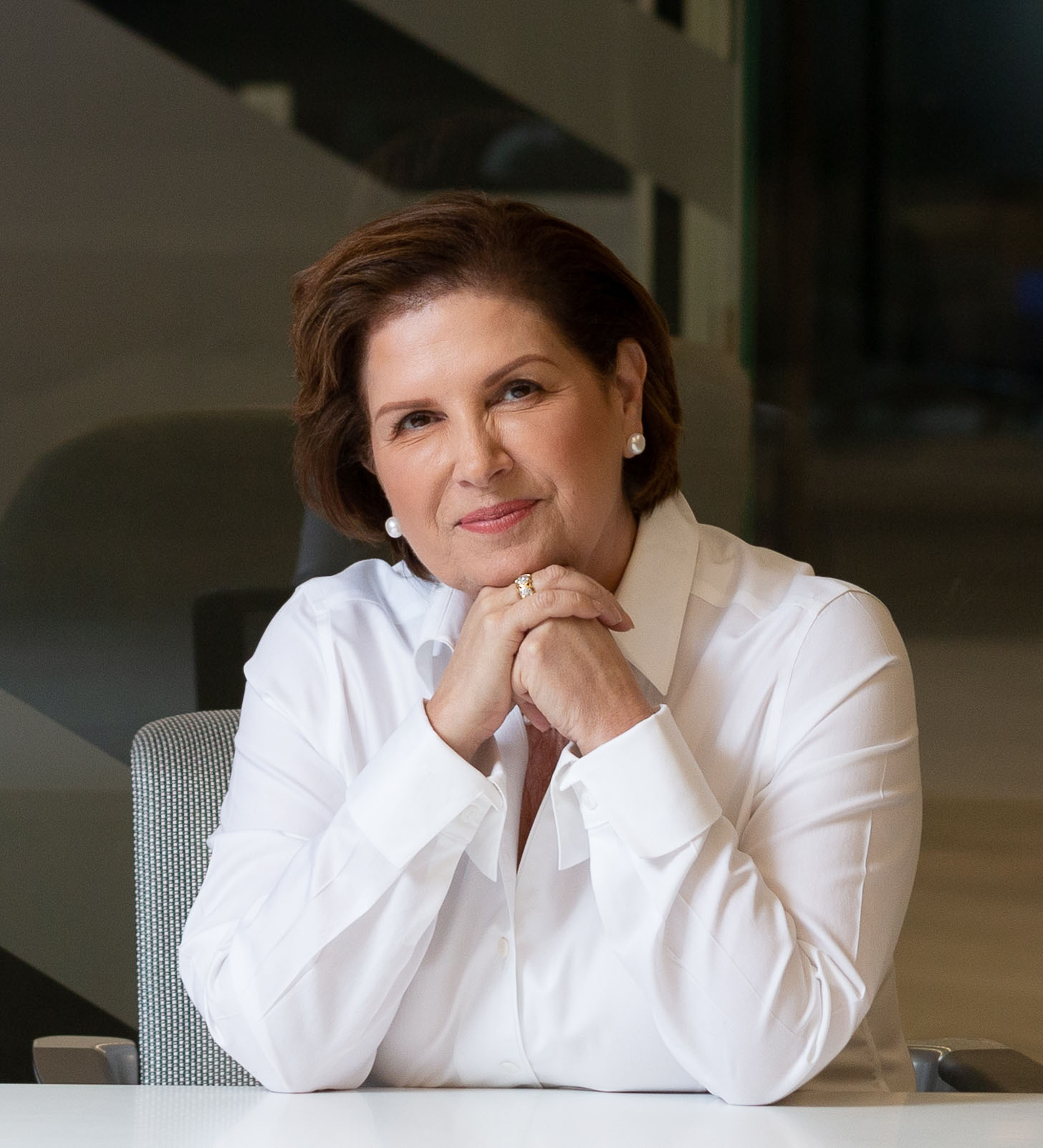
- Born: Lima, Peru
- Education: Universidad Peruana Cayetano Heredia; University of Virginia (PhD)
- Occupations: Founder and principal of The Freire Group; chair of the Biogen board of directors
- Known for: Public–private partnerships in tuberculosis drug development ; technology transfer at the National Institutes of Health

Maria C. Freire is a Peruvian-American biophysicist and life-sciences executive. She is the founder and principal of The Freire Group, a strategic advisory firm serving life-sciences organizations, and in February 2026 was elected chair of the Biogen board of directors, effective after the company's annual meeting on 9 June 2026. She previously served as president and executive director of the Foundation for the National Institutes of Health (FNIH) from 2012 to 2021, as president of the Albert and Mary Lasker Foundation from 2008 to 2012, and as president and chief executive officer of the Global Alliance for TB Drug Development from 2001 to 2008. She is a member of the U.S. National Academy of Medicine and the Council on Foreign Relations. Freire works in global health, technology commercialization and intellectual property management, focusing on the discovery, development and access to medical interventions.

== Early life and education ==
A native of Lima, Peru, Freire earned a Bachelor of Science at the Universidad Peruana Cayetano Heredia. She received a Ph.D. in biophysics from the University of Virginia and conducted postgraduate work in immunology at the University of Virginia and in virology at the University of Tennessee. She is the recipient of a Fulbright Fellowship as well as two AAAS Congressional Science Fellowships.

== Career ==
Freire established and led the Office of Technology Development at the University of Maryland, Baltimore and the University of Maryland, Baltimore County. Freire directed the Office of Technology Transfer at the National Institutes of Health from 1995 to 2001, the office responsible for patenting, marketing, licensing, and monitoring activities for inventions arising from the NIH and the U.S. Food and Drug Administration. From 2001 to 2008, she was the president and chief executive officer of the Global Alliance for TB Drug Development. From 2008 to 2012 she was president of the Albert and Mary Lasker Foundation.

=== Foundation for the National Institutes of Health ===
Freire was president and executive director of the Foundation for the National Institutes of Health (FNIH) from November 2012 to September 2021. She joined the foundation from the Lasker Foundation. Freire stepped down in September 2021.

=== The Freire Group and corporate boards ===
After leaving the FNIH in 2021, Freire founded The Freire Group, a strategic advisory firm serving life-sciences organizations. She joined the Biogen board of directors in 2021, serving on its Corporate Governance Committee and its Compensation and Management Development Committee. In February 2026, Biogen announced that Freire had been elected chair of the board, succeeding Caroline Dorsa, with the role taking effect after the company's annual meeting on 9 June 2026.

== Public service and advisory roles ==
Freire was a member of the Leadership Group of Accelerating COVID-19 Therapeutics and Vaccines (ACTIV). She was a member of the Science Board of the U.S. Food and Drug Administration (FDA) and chaired it from 2013 to 2015. She also served as a member of the Commission on the Global Health Risk Framework for the Future of the National Academy of Medicine and the executive committee of the United Nations' Sustainable Development Solutions Network. Freire served as a member of the UN Secretary-General's High-Level Panel on Access to Medicines. She was selected as one of ten commissioners of the World Health Organization's Commission on Intellectual Property Rights, Innovation and Public Health (CIPIH). Freire was also appointed to the Advisory Committee to the Director of the National Institutes of Health.

=== Other memberships and board service ===
In 2008, Freire was elected to the Institute of Medicine (National Academy of Medicine). She was elected to the Council on Foreign Relations in 2009. She serves on the boards of directors of Exelixis, Inc. and, since April 2012, Alexandria Real Estate Equities, Inc. She is also a member of the board of directors of Keystone Symposia on Molecular and Cellular Biology.

== Selected awards ==
- 2002 Bayh–Dole Award, Association of University Technology Managers
- 2019 NonProfit PRO "Executive of the Year" Award
- 2023 Great Immigrants Award Honoree, Carnegie Corporation of New York
