= 2-phospho-L-lactate transferase =

Class of enzymes

Identifiers
- EC no.: 2.7.8.28

Databases
- BRENDA: enzyme data
- ExPASy: NiceZyme view
- KEGG: enzyme entry
- MetaCyc: metabolic pathway
- Rhea: reactions
- PDB structures: RCSB PDB PDBe PDBsum
Search
- PMC: articles
- PubMed: articles
- NCBI: proteins

2-phospho-L-lactate transferase (EC 2.7.8.28, LPPG:Fo 2-phospho-L-lactate transferase, LPPG:7,8-didemethyl-8-hydroxy-5-deazariboflavin 2-phospho-L-lactate transferase, MJ1256, lactyl-2-diphospho-(5')guanosine:Fo 2-phospho-L-lactate transferase, CofD) is an enzyme with systematic name (2S)-lactyl-2-diphospho-5'-guanosine:7,8-didemethyl-8-hydroxy-5-deazariboflavin 2-phospho-L-lactate transferase. It catalyses the following chemical reaction

(1)
+
(2S)-Lactyl-2-diphospho-5'-guanosine
GMP
coenzyme F420-0

Coenzyme F420

The enzyme characterised from Methanococcus jannaschii uses (2S)-lactyl-2-diphospho-5'-guanosine to link the terminal hydroxy group of 7,8-didemethyl-8-hydroxy-5-deazariboflavin (1) through a phosphate ester to a lactic acid. Guanosine monophosphate (GMP) is a byproduct. This reaction is part of the biosynthesis of coenzyme F420. The enzyme is also present in Paraburkholderia rhizoxinica and many other bacteria and archaea.
