= 7,8-didemethyl-8-hydroxy-5-deazariboflavin synthase =

Class of enzymes

7,8-didemethyl-8-hydroxy-5-deazariboflavin synthase (CofG)

Identifiers
- EC no.: 4.3.1.32

Databases
- IntEnz: IntEnz view
- BRENDA: BRENDA entry
- ExPASy: NiceZyme view
- KEGG: KEGG entry
- MetaCyc: metabolic pathway
- PRIAM: profile
- PDB structures: RCSB PDB PDBe PDBsum
- Gene Ontology: AmiGO / QuickGO
Search
- PMC: articles
- PubMed: articles
- NCBI: proteins

5-amino-6-(D-ribitylamino)uracil--L-tyrosine 4-hydroxyphenyl transferase (CofH)

Identifiers
- EC no.: 2.5.1.147

Databases
- IntEnz: IntEnz view
- BRENDA: BRENDA entry
- ExPASy: NiceZyme view
- KEGG: KEGG entry
- MetaCyc: metabolic pathway
- PRIAM: profile
- PDB structures: RCSB PDB PDBe PDBsum
Search
- PMC: articles
- PubMed: articles
- NCBI: proteins

7,8-didemethyl-8-hydroxy-5-deazariboflavin synthase (EC 4.3.1.32, FO synthase) and 5-amino-6-(D-ribitylamino)uracil—L-tyrosine 4-hydroxyphenyl transferase (EC 2.5.1.147) are two enzymes always complexed together to achieve synthesis of FO, a precursor to Coenzyme F420. Their systematic names are 5-amino-5-(4-hydroxybenzyl)-6-(D-ribitylimino)-5,6-dihydrouracil ammonia-lyase (7,8-didemethyl-8-hydroxy-5-deazariboflavin-forming) and 5-amino-6-(D-ribitylamino)uracil:L-tyrosine, 4-hydroxyphenyl transferase respectively. The enzymes catalyse the following chemical reactions:

(2.5.1.147) 5-amino-6-(D-ribitylamino)uracil + L-tyrosine + S-adenosyl-L-methionine = 5-amino-5-(4-hydroxybenzyl)-6-(D-ribitylimino)-5,6-dihydrouracil + 2-iminoacetate + L-methionine + 5'-deoxyadenosin
(4.3.1.32) 5-amino-5-(4-hydroxybenzyl)-6-(D-ribitylimino)-5,6-dihydrouracil + S-adenosyl-L-methionine = 7,8-didemethyl-8-hydroxy-5-deazariboflavin + NH_{3} + L-methionine + 5'-deoxyadenosine

Enzyme 2.5.1.147 binds a 4Fe-4S cluster. The condensation reaction is initiated by the 5'-deoxyadenosyl radical. The complex was formerly named as a single entity under EC 2.5.1.77.

CofG

Identifiers
- Symbol: CofG
- InterPro: IPR019939

CofH

Identifiers
- Symbol: CofH
- InterPro: IPR019940

All members of these enzymes belong to a single clade of the CofH (2.5.1.147) and CofG (4.3.1.32) families, sharing a TIM barrel structure. The two EC numbers represent discrete steps in this reaction. Some enzyme complexes have CofG and CofH (subunits 1 and 2) in different chains assembled into a heterodimer, while others like the bifunctional fbiC has the two domains on one single chain.
