= Photolyase =

Class of enzymes

Cryptochrome/photolyase, C-terminal, FAD binding
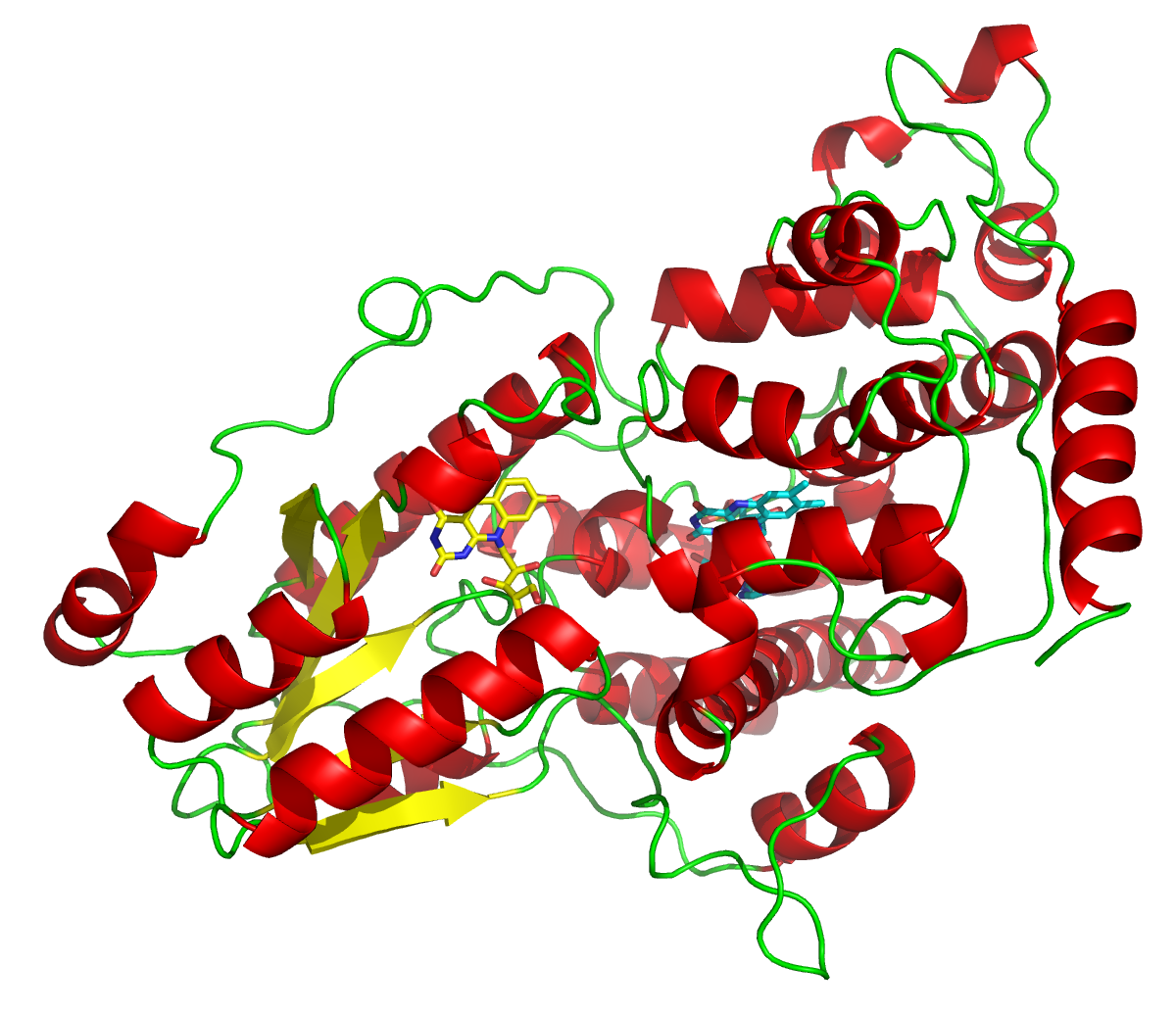
- A deazaflavin photolyase from Anacystis nidulans, illustrating the two light-harvesting cofactors: FADH^{−} (yellow) and 8-HDF (cyan).

Identifiers
- Symbol: FAD_binding_7
- Pfam: PF03441
- InterPro: IPR005101
- PROSITE: PDOC00331
- SCOP2: 1qnf / SCOPe / SUPFAM
Available protein structures:
- PDB: 1u3cA:214-492 1u3dA:214-492 1iquA:176-418 1iqrA:176-418 1dnpB:202-469 1tezD:207-472 1owmA:207-472 1qnf :207-472 1owpA:207-472 1owoA:207-472 1owlA:207-472 1ownA:207-472 1np7B:213-453 IPR005101 PF03441 (ECOD; PDBsum)
- AlphaFold: IPR005101; PF03441

deoxyribodipyrimidine photo-lyase (CPD)
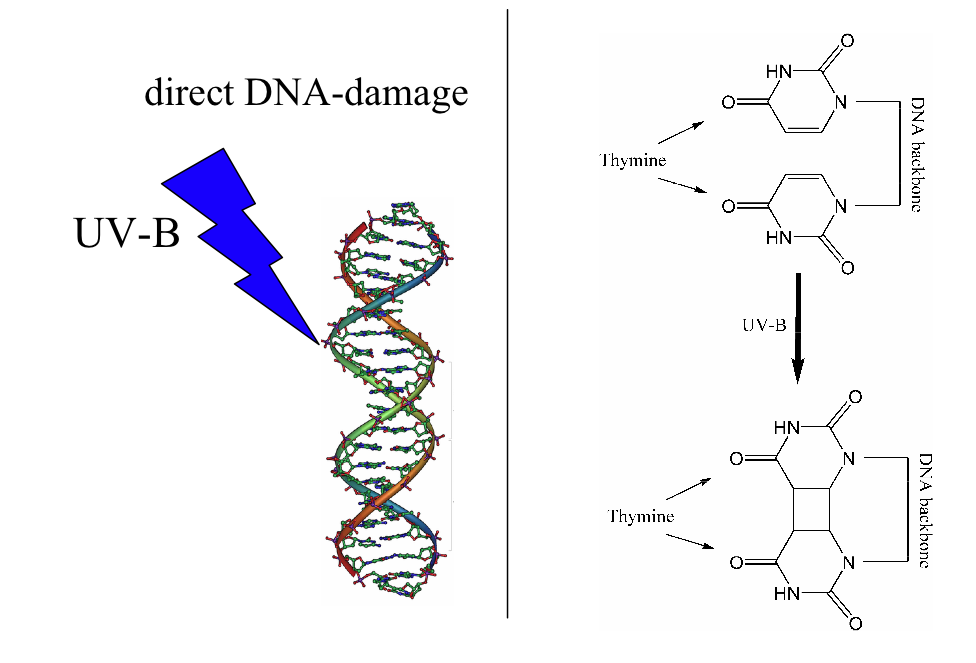
- A UV radiation induced thymine-thymine cyclobutane dimer (right) is the type of DNA damage which is repaired by DNA photolyase. Note: The above diagram is incorrectly labelled as thymine as the structures lack 5-methyl groups.

Identifiers
- EC no.: 4.1.99.3
- CAS no.: 37290-70-3

Databases
- BRENDA: enzyme data
- ExPASy: NiceZyme view
- KEGG: enzyme entry
- MetaCyc: metabolic pathway
- Rhea: reactions
- PDB structures: RCSB PDB PDBe PDBsum
- Gene Ontology: AmiGO / QuickGO
Search
- PMC: articles
- PubMed: articles
- NCBI: proteins

Photolyases (EC 4.1.99.3) are DNA repair enzymes that repair damage caused by exposure to ultraviolet light. These enzymes require visible light (from the violet/blue end of the spectrum) both for their own activation and for the actual DNA repair. The DNA repair mechanism involving photolyases is called photoreactivation. They mainly convert pyrimidine dimers into a normal pair of pyrimidine bases. Photo reactivation, the first DNA repair mechanism to be discovered, was described initially by Albert Kelner in 1949 and independently by Renato Dulbecco also in 1949.

== Function ==
Photolyases bind complementary DNA strands and break certain types of pyrimidine dimers that arise when a pair of thymine or cytosine bases on the same strand of DNA become covalently linked. The bond length of this dimerization is shorter than the bond length of normal B-DNA structure which produces an incorrect template for replication and transcription. The more common covalent linkage involves the formation of a cyclobutane bridge. Photolyases have a high affinity for these lesions and reversibly bind and convert them back to the original bases. The photolyase-catalyzed DNA repair process by which cyclobutane pyrimidine dimers are resolved has been studied by time-resolved crystallography and computational analysis to allow atomic visualization of the process.

== Evolution ==
Photolyase is a phylogenetically old enzyme which is present and functional in many species, from the bacteria to the fungi to plants and to the animals. Photolyase is particularly important in repairing UV induced damage in plants. The photolyase mechanism is no longer working in humans and other placental mammals who instead rely on the less efficient nucleotide excision repair mechanism, although they do retain many cryptochromes. Freezing stress in the annual wheat Triticum aestivum and in its perennial relative Thinopyrum intermedium is accompanied by large increases in expression of DNA photolyases.

Photolyases are flavoproteins and contain two light-harvesting cofactors. Many photolyases have an N-terminal domain that binds a second cofactor. All photolyases contain the two-electron-reduced FADH^{−}; they are divided into two main classes based on the second cofactor, which may be either the pterin methenyltetrahydrofolate (MTHF) in folate photolyases or the deazaflavin 8-hydroxy-7,8-didemethyl-5-deazariboflavin (8-HDF) in deazaflavin photolyases. Although only FAD is required for catalytic activity, the second cofactor significantly accelerates reaction rate in low-light conditions. The enzyme acts by electron transfer in which the reduced flavin FADH^{−} is activated by light energy and acts as an electron donor to break the pyrimidine dimer.

On the basis of sequence similarities DNA photolyases can be grouped into a few classes:

Cryptochrome/photolyase family (2015)

- FeS-BCP
- - CPD-2
  - - - CPD-1
      - - CPD-3gre
        - Plant Cry
        - P. tricornutum CryP]
    - - Cry-DASH
      - Eukaryotic 6-4; Animal Cry

- Class 1 CPD photolyases are enzymes that process cyclobutane pyrimidine dimer (CPD) lesions from Gram-negative and Gram-positive bacteria, as well as the halophilic archaea Halobacterium halobium.
- Class 2 CPD photolyases also process CPD lesions. They are found in plants like the thale cress Arabidopsis thaliana and the rice.
- The plant and fungi cryptochromes are similar to Class 1 CPDs. They are blue light photoreceptors that mediate blue light-induced gene expression and modulation of circadian rhythms.
- Class 3 CPD lyases make up a sister group to the plant cryptochromes, which in turn are a sister group to class 1 CPDs.
- The Cry-DASH group are CPD lyases highly specific for single-stranded DNA. Members include Vibrio cholerae, X1Cry from Xenopus laevis, and AtCry3 from Arabidopsis thaliana. DASH was initially named after Drosophila, Arabidopsis, Synechocystis, and Human, four taxa initially thought to carry this family of lyases. The categorization has since changed. The "Cry" part of their name was due to initial assumptions that they were cryptochromes.
- Eukaryotic (6-4)DNA photolyases form a group with animal cryptochromes that control circadian rhythms. They are found in diverse species including Drosophila and humans. The cryptochromes have their own detailed grouping.
- Bacterial 6-4 lyases (InterPro: IPR007357), also known as the FeS-BCP group, form their own outgroup relative to all photolyases.

The non-class 2 branch of CPDs tend to be grouped into class 1 in some systems such as PRINTS (PR00147). Although the members of the smaller groups are agreed upon, the phylogeny can vary greatly among authors due to differences in methodology, leading to some confusion with authors who try to fit everything (sparing FeS-BCP) into a two-class classification. The cryptochromes form a polyphyletic group including photolyases that have lost their DNA repair activity and instead control circadian rhythms.

== Application ==
Adding photolyase from a blue-green algae Anacystis nidulans, to HeLa cells partially reduced DNA damage from UVB exposure.

== Human proteins containing this domain ==
Cryptochromes: CRY1; CRY2

== Nomenclature ==
The systematic name of this enzyme class is deoxyribocyclobutadipyrimidine pyrimidine-lyase. Other names in common use include photoreactivating enzyme, DNA photolyase, DNA-photoreactivating enzyme, DNA cyclobutane dipyrimidine photolyase, DNA photolyase, deoxyribonucleic photolyase, deoxyribodipyrimidine photolyase, photolyase, PRE, PhrB photolyase, deoxyribonucleic cyclobutane dipyrimidine photolyase, phr A photolyase, dipyrimidine photolyase (photosensitive), and deoxyribonucleate pyrimidine dimer lyase (photosensitive). This enzyme belongs to the family of lyases, specifically in the "catch-all" class of carbon-carbon lyases.
