= Cryptochrome =

Class of photoreceptors in plants and animals

Cryptochrome-1
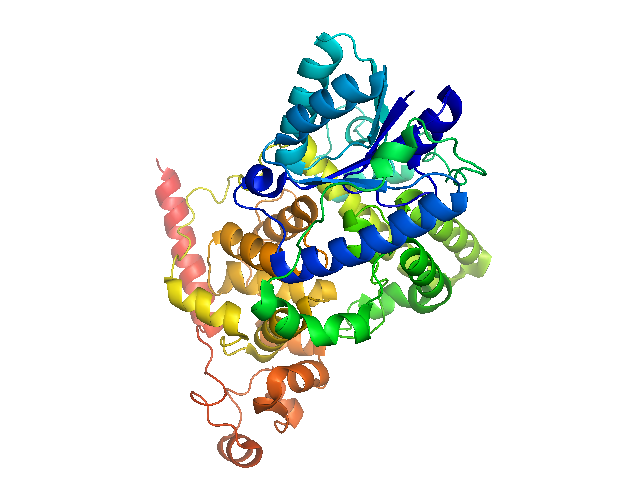
- Crystallographic structure of Cryptochrome-1

Identifiers
- Symbol: CRY1
- NCBI gene: 1407
- HGNC: 2384
- OMIM: 601933
- PDB: 5T5X
- RefSeq: NP_004066
- UniProt: Q16526

Other data
- Locus: Chr. 12 q23.3
Search for
- Structures: Swiss-model
- Domains: InterPro

Cryptochrome-2

Identifiers
- Symbol: CRY2
- NCBI gene: 1408
- HGNC: 2385
- OMIM: 603732
- PDB: 4MLP
- RefSeq: NP_066940
- UniProt: Q49AN0

Other data
- Locus: Chr. 11 p11.2
Search for
- Structures: Swiss-model
- Domains: InterPro

Cryptochromes (from the Greek κρυπτός χρώμα, "hidden colour") are a class of flavoproteins found in plants and animals that are sensitive to blue light. They are involved in the circadian rhythms and the sensing of magnetic fields in a number of species. The name cryptochrome was proposed as a portmanteau combining the chromatic nature of the photoreceptor, and the cryptogamic organisms on which many blue-light studies were carried out.

The genes CRY1 and CRY2 encode the proteins CRY1 and CRY2, respectively. Cryptochromes are classified into plant Cry and animal Cry. Animal Cry can be further categorized into insect type (Type I) and mammal-like (Type II). CRY1 is a circadian photoreceptor whereas CRY2 is a clock repressor which represses Clock/Cycle (Bmal1) complex in insects and vertebrates. In plants, blue-light photoreception can be used to cue developmental signals. Besides chlorophylls, cryptochromes are the only proteins known to form photoinduced radical-pairs in vivo. These appear to enable some animals to detect magnetic fields.

Cryptochromes have been the focus of several efforts in optogenetics. Employing transfection, initial studies on yeast have capitalized on the potential of CRY2 heterodimerization to control cellular processes, including gene expression, by light.

== Discovery ==
Although Charles Darwin first documented plant responses to blue light in the 1880s, it was not until the 1980s that research began to identify the pigment responsible. In 1980, researchers discovered that the HY4 gene of the plant Arabidopsis thaliana was necessary for the plant's blue light sensitivity, and, when the gene was sequenced in 1993, it showed high sequence homology with photolyase, a DNA repair protein activated by blue light. Reference sequence analysis of cryptochrome-1 isoform d shows two conserved domains with photolyase proteins. Isoform d nucleotide positions 6 through 491 show a conserved domain with deoxyribodipyrimidine photolyase, and positions 288 through 486 show a conserved domain with the FAD binding domain of DNA photolyase. Comparative genomic analysis supports photolyase proteins as the ancestors of cryptochromes. However, by 1995 it became clear that the products of the HY4 gene and its two human homologs did not exhibit photolyase activity and were instead a new class of blue light photoreceptor hypothesized to be circadian photopigments. In 1996 and 1998, Cry homologs were identified in Drosophila and mice, respectively.

== Evolutionary history ==
Cryptochromes (CRY1, CRY2) are evolutionarily old and highly conserved proteins that belong to the flavoproteins superfamily that exists in all kingdoms of life. Cryptochromes are derived from and closely related to photolyases, which are bacterial enzymes that are activated by light and involved in the repair of UV-induced DNA damage.

In eukaryotes, cryptochromes no longer retain this original enzymatic activity. By using a T-DNA labeled allele of the cry1 gene in the Arabidopsis plant, researchers determined that the cry1 gene encoded a flavoprotein without photolyase activity and with a unique C-terminal tail. The protein encoded by this gene was named cryptochrome 1 to distinguish it from its ancestral photolyase proteins and was found to be involved in the photoreception of blue light. Studies of Drosophila cry-knockout mutants led to the later discovery that cryptochrome proteins are also involved in regulating the mammalian circadian clock. The Drosophila cry gene similarly encodes a flavoprotein without photolyase activity that also binds pterin chromophores. Cry mutants (cry^{b}) were found to express arrhythmic levels of luciferase as well as PER and TIM proteins in photoreceptor cells. Despite the arrhythmicity of these protein levels, cry^{b} mutants still showed rhythmicity in overall behavior but could not entrain to short pulses of light, leading researchers to conclude that the dorsal and ventral lateral neurons (the primary pacemaker cells of Drosophila) were still functioning effectively. When cry^{b} mutants also had visually unresponsive compound eyes, though, they failed to behaviorally entrain to environmental cues. These findings led researchers to conclude that the cryptochrome protein encoded by cry is necessary for Drosophila photoentrainment. In mammals, a protein analog of the Drosophila cryptochrome protein was discovered with the characteristic property of lacking photolyase activity, prompting researchers to consider it in the same class of cryptochrome proteins. In mice, the greatest cry1 expression is observed in the suprachiasmatic nucleus (SCN) where levels rhythmically fluctuate. Due to the role of the SCN as the primary mammalian pacemaker as well as the rhythmic fluctuations in cry1 expression, researchers concluded cry1 was also necessary for the entrainment of mammalian circadian rhythms.

A common misconception in the evolutionary history of cryptochrome proteins is that mammalian and plant proteins are orthologs of each other that evolved directly from a shared photolyase gene. However, genomic analysis indicates that mammalian and fly cryptochrome proteins show greater sequence similarity to the (6-4) photolyase proteins than to plant cryptochrome proteins. It is therefore likely that plant and animal cryptochrome proteins show a unique case of convergent evolution by repeatedly evolving new functions independently of each other from a single common ancestral cry gene.

Research by Worthington et al. (2003) indicates that cryptochromes first evolved in bacteria and were identified in Vibrio cholerae. Genome sequencing of this bacteria identified three genes in the photolyase/cryptochrome family, all of which have the folate and flavin cofactors characteristic of these proteins. Of these genes, one encodes a photolyase, while the other two encode cryptochrome proteins designated VcCry1 and VcCry2. Cashmore AR et al. (1999) hypothesize that mammalian cryptochromes developed later in evolutionary history shortly after plants and animals diverged based on conserved genomic domains between animal cryptochromes and the Arabidopsis (6-4) photolyase protein. Based on the role of cryptochromes in the entrainment of mammalian circadian rhythms, current researchers hypothesize that they developed simultaneously with the coevolution of PER, TIM, CLOCK, and CYCLE proteins, but there is currently insufficient evidence to determine the exact evolution timing and mechanism of evolution.

== Structure ==
All members of the flavoprotein superfamily have the characteristics of an N-terminal photolyase homology (PHR) domain. The PHR domain can bind to the flavin adenine dinucleotide (FAD) cofactor and a light-harvesting chromophore. The structure of cryptochrome involves a fold very similar to that of photolyase, arranged as an orthogonal bundle with a single molecule of FAD noncovalently bound to the protein. These proteins have variable lengths and surfaces on the C-terminal end, due to the changes in genome and appearance that result from the lack of DNA repair enzymes. The Ramachandran plot shows that the secondary structure of the CRY1 protein is primarily a right-handed alpha helix with little to no steric overlap. The structure of CRY1 is almost entirely made up of alpha helices, with several loops and few beta sheets.

== Function ==
=== Phototropism ===
In plants, cryptochromes mediate phototropism, or directional growth toward a light source, in response to blue light. This response is now known to have its own set of photoreceptors, the phototropins.

Unlike phytochromes and phototropins, cryptochromes are not kinases. Their flavin chromophore is reduced by light and transported into the cell nucleus, where it affects the turgor pressure and causes subsequent stem elongation. To be specific, Cry2 is responsible for blue-light-mediated cotyledon and leaf expansion. Cry2 overexpression in transgenic plants increases blue-light-stimulated cotyledon expansion, which results in many broad leaves and no flowers rather than a few primary leaves with a flower. A double loss-of-function mutation in Arabidopsis thaliana Early Flowering 3 (elf3) and Cry2 genes delays flowering under continuous light and was shown to accelerate it during long and short days, which suggests that Arabidopsis CRY2 may play a role in accelerating flowering time during continuous light.

=== Photomorphogenesis ===
Cryptochromes receptors cause plants to respond to blue light via photomorphogenesis. They help control seed and seedling development, as well as the switch from the vegetative to the flowering stage of development.

In Arabidopsis, CRY1 is the primary inhibitor of hypocotyl elongation but CRY2 inhibits hypocotyl elongation under low blue light intensity. CRY2 promotes flowering under long-day conditions.

CRY gene mediates photomorphogenesis in several ways. CRY C-terminal interacts with CONTITUTIVE PHOTOMORPHOGENIC 1 (COP1), a E3 ubiquitin ligase that represses photomorphogenesis and flowering time. The interaction inhibits COP1 activity and allows transcription factors such as ELONGATED HYPOCOTYL 5 (HY5) to accumulate. HY5 is a basic leucine zipper (bZIP) factor that promotes photomorphogenesis by binding to light-responsive genes. CRY interacts with G protein β-subunit AGB1, where HY5 dissociates from AGB1 and becomes activated. CRY interacts with PHYTOCHROME-INTERACTING FACTOR 4 (PIF4) and PIF5, repressors of photomorphogenesis and promoter of hypocotyl elongation, to repress PIF4 and PIF5 transcription activity. Lastly, CRY can inhibit auxin and brassinosterioid (BR) signaling to promote photomorphogenesis.

=== Light capture ===
Despite much research on the topic, cryptochrome photoreception and phototransduction in Drosophila and Arabidopsis thaliana is still poorly understood. Cryptochromes are known to possess two chromophores: pterin (in the form of 5,10-methenyltetrahydrofolic acid (MTHF)) and flavin (in the form of FAD). Both may absorb a photon, and in Arabidopsis, pterin appears to absorb at a wavelength of 380 nm and flavin at 450 nm. Past studies have supported a model by which energy captured by pterin is transferred to flavin. Under this model of phototransduction, FAD would then be reduced to FADH, which probably mediates the phosphorylation of a certain domain in cryptochrome. This could then trigger a signal transduction chain, possibly affecting gene regulation in the cell nucleus.

A new hypothesis proposes that partner molecules sense the transduction of a light signal into a chemical signal in plant cryptochromes, which could be triggered by a photo-induced negative charge on the FAD cofactor or on the neighboring aspartic acid within the protein. This negative charge would electrostatically repel the protein-bound ATP molecule and thereby also the protein C-terminal domain, which covers the ATP binding pocket prior to photon absorption. The resulting change in protein conformation could lead to phosphorylation of previously inaccessible phosphorylation sites on the C-terminus and the given phosphorylated segment could then liberate the transcription factor HY5 by competing for the same binding site at the negative regulator of photomorphogenesis COP1.

A different mechanism may function in Drosophila. The true ground state of the flavin cofactor in Drosophila CRY is still debated, with some models indicating that the FAD is in an oxidized form, while others support a model in which the flavin cofactor exists in anion radical form, FAD^{−}•. Recently, researchers have observed that oxidized FAD is readily reduced to FAD^{−}• by light. Furthermore, mutations that blocked photoreduction had no effect on light-induced degradation of CRY, while mutations that altered the stability of FAD^{−}• destroyed CRY photoreceptor function. These observations provide support for a ground state of FAD^{−}•. Researchers have also recently proposed a model in which FAD^{−} is excited to its doublet or quartet state by absorption of a photon, which then leads to a conformational change in the CRY protein.

Also the ring eyes of the demosponge larva of Amphimedon queenslandica express a blue-light-sensitive cryptochrome (Aq-Cry2), which might mediate phototaxis. In contrast, the eyes of most animals use photo-sensitive opsins expressed in photoreceptor cells, which communicate information about light from the environment to the nervous system. However, A. queenslandica lacks a nervous system, like other sponges. And it does not have an opsin gene in its fully sequenced genome either, despite having many other G-protein-coupled receptors (GPCRs). Therefore, the sponge's unique eyes must have evolved a different mechanism to detect light and mediate phototaxis, possibly with cryptochromes or other proteins.

=== Iris function ===
Isolated irises constrict in response to light via a photomechanical transduction response (PMTR) in a variety of species and require either melanopsin or cryptochrome to do so. The iris of chicken embryos senses short-wavelength light via a cryptochrome, rather than opsins. Research by Margiotta and Howard (2020) shows that the PMTR of the chicken iris striated muscle occurs with CRY gene activation by 430 nm blue light. The PMTR was inhibited in CRY gene knockouts and decreased when flavin reductase was inhibited, but remained intact with the addition of melanopsin antagonists. Similarly, cytosolic CRY1 and CRY2 proteins were found in iris myotubes, and decreasing transcription of these genes inhibited PMTRs. The greatest iris PMTRs therefore correspond with the development of striated, rather than smooth, muscle fibers through CRY-mediated PMTRs.

=== Circadian rhythm ===
Studies in animals and plants suggest that cryptochromes play a pivotal role in the generation and maintenance of circadian rhythms. Similarly, cryptochromes play an important role in the entrainment of circadian rhythms in plants. In Drosophila, cryptochrome (dCRY) acts as a blue-light photoreceptor that directly modulates light input into the circadian clock, while in mammals, cryptochromes (CRY1 and CRY2) act as transcription repressors within the circadian clockwork. Some insects, including the monarch butterfly, have both a mammal-like and a Drosophila-like version of cryptochrome, providing evidence for an ancestral clock mechanism involving both light-sensing and transcriptional-repression roles for cryptochrome.

Cry mutants have altered circadian rhythms, showing that Cry affects the circadian pacemaker. Drosophila with mutated Cry exhibit little to no mRNA cycling. A point mutation in cry^{b}, which is required for flavin association in CRY protein, results in no PER or TIM protein cycling in either DD or LD. In addition, mice lacking Cry1 or Cry2 genes exhibit differentially altered free running periods, but are still capable of photoentrainment. However, mice that lack both Cry1 and Cry2 are arrhythmic in both LD and DD and always have high Per1 mRNA levels. These results suggest that cryptochromes play a photoreceptive role, as well as acting as negative regulators of Per gene expression in mice.

==== In Drosophila ====
In Drosophila, cryptochrome is only encoded by one Cry gene (dCry) and functions as a blue light photoreceptor. Exposure to blue light induces a conformation similar to that of the always-active CRY mutant with a C-terminal deletion (CRYΔ). The half-life of this conformation is 15 minutes in the dark and facilitates the binding of CRY to other clock gene products, PER and TIM, in a light-dependent manner. Once bound by dCRY, dTIM is committed to degradation by the ubiquitin-proteasome system.

Although light pulses do not entrain, full photoperiod LD cycles can still drive cycling in the ventral-lateral neurons in the Drosophila brain. These data along with other results suggest that CRY is the cell-autonomous photoreceptor for body clocks in Drosophila and may play a role in nonparametric entrainment (entrainment by short discrete light pulses). However, the lateral neurons receive light information through both the blue light CRY pathway and the rhodopsin pathway. Therefore, CRY is involved in light perception and is an input to the circadian clock, however it is not the only input for light information, as a sustained rhythm has been shown in the absence of the CRY pathway, in which it is believed that the rhodopsin pathway is providing some light input. Recently, it has also been shown that there is a CRY-mediated light response that is independent of the classical circadian CRY-TIM interaction. This mechanism is believed to require a flavin redox-based mechanism that is dependent on potassium channel conductance. This CRY-mediated light response has been shown to increase action potential firing within seconds of a light response in opsin-knockout Drosophila.

Cryptochrome, like many genes involved in circadian rhythm, shows circadian cycling in mRNA and protein levels. In Drosophila, Cry mRNA concentrations cycle under a light-dark cycle (LD), with high levels in light and low levels in the dark. This cycling persists in constant darkness (DD), but with decreased amplitude. The transcription of the Cry gene also cycles with a similar trend. CRY protein levels, however, cycle in a different manner than Cry transcription and mRNA levels. In LD, CRY protein has low levels in light and high levels in dark, and, in DD, CRY levels increase continuously throughout the subjective day and night. Thus, CRY expression is regulated by the clock at the transcriptional level and by light at the translational and posttranslational level.

Overexpression of Cry also affects circadian light responses. In Drosophila, Cry overexpression increases flies' sensitivity to low-intensity light. This light regulation of CRY protein levels suggests that CRY has a circadian role upstream of other clock genes and components.

==== In mammals ====
In mammals, cryptochrome proteins are encoded by two genes, Cry1 and Cry2.

===== Cry2 =====
Cryptochrome is one of the four groups of mammalian clock genes/proteins that generate a transcription-translation negative-feedback loop (TTFL), along with Period (PER), CLOCK, and BMAL1. In this loop, CLOCK and BMAL1 proteins are transcriptional activators, which together bind to the promoters of the Cry2 and Per genes and activate their transcription. The CRY2 and PER proteins then bind to each other, enter the nucleus, and inhibit CLOCK-BMAL1-activated transcription. The overall function of CRY2 is therefore to repress transcription of CLOCK and BMAL1.

===== Cry1 =====
Cry1 encodes the CRY1 protein which is a mammalian circadian photoreceptor. In mice, Cry1 expression displays circadian rhythms in the suprachiasmatic nucleus, a brain region involved in the generation of circadian rhythms, with mRNA levels peaking during the light phase and reaching a minimum in the dark. These daily oscillations in expression are maintained in constant darkness.

While CRY1 has been well established as a TIM homolog in mammals, the role of CRY1 as a photoreceptor in mammals has been controversial. Early papers indicated that CRY1 has both light-independent and -dependent functions. A study conducted by Selby CP et al. (2000) found that mice without rhodopsin but with cryptochrome still respond to light; however, in mice without either rhodopsin or cryptochrome, c-Fos transcription, a mediator of light sensitivity, significantly drops. In recent years, data have supported melanopsin as the main circadian photoreceptor, in particular melanopsin cells that mediate entrainment and communication between the eye and the suprachiasmatic nucleus (SCN). One of the main difficulties in confirming or denying CRY as a mammalian photoreceptor is that when the gene is knocked out the animal goes arrhythmic, so it is hard to measure its capacity as purely a photoreceptor. However, some recent studies indicate that human CRY1 may mediate light response in peripheral tissues.

Normal mammalian circadian rhythm relies critically on delayed expression of Cry1 following activation of the Cry1 promoter. Whereas rhythms in Per2 promoter activation and Per2 mRNA levels have almost the same phase, Cry1 mRNA production is delayed by approximately four hours relative to Cry1 promoter activation. This delay is independent of CRY1 or CRY2 levels and is mediated by a combination of E/E'-box and D-box elements in the promoter and RevErbA/ROR binding elements (RREs) in the gene's first intron. Transfection of arrhythmic Cry1^{−/−} Cry2^{−/−} double-knockout cells with only the Cry1 promoter (causing constitutive Cry1 expression) is not sufficient to rescue rhythmicity. Transfection of these cells with both the promoter and the first intron is required for restoration of circadian rhythms in these cells.

There is evidence that CRY1 can play a role in how sleep-wake patterns can be inherited through families. There is a mutation, CRY1Δ11, that causes a delay in one's circadian rhythm. CRY1Δ11 is a splicing variant that has deleted an auto-inhibitory section of the gene. It causes a delay by increasing the affinity of CLOCK and BMAL which in turn lengthens the period. This causes people with this mutation to have a later sleep midpoint than the rest of the population, causing a disorder known as delayed sleep–wake phase disorder.

CRY1 is also a key modulator in DNA repair, specifically through temporal regulation. CRY1 has an impact in the cell cycle progression, particularly in the G2/M checkpoint, and the depletion of CRY1 leads to effects on DNA repair networks, including mismatch repair, UV, and nucleotide excision. In cancer, CRY1 is stabilized by DNA damage, which results in CRY1 expression being associated with worse outcomes in prostate cancer. Because of its role in DNA repair and being pro-tumorigenic, further research can use CRY1 as a therapeutic target.

Variants of CRY1 can have impacts on humans in regards to metabolic output. According to a 2021 study, metabolic outputs, measured by bowel movements, were severely different for participants who were wild type in comparison to those with the CRY1Δ11 variant. The participants with the variant had a delayed sleep cycle and delayed metabolic output when compared to the wild type.

=== Magnetoreception ===
The radical pair mechanism has been proposed for quantum magnetoreception in birds.

Magnetoreception is a sense which allows an organism to detect a magnetic field to perceive direction, altitude or location. Experimental data suggests that cryptochromes in the photoreceptor neurons of birds' eyes are involved in magnetic orientation during migration. Cryptochromes are also thought to be essential for the light-dependent ability of Drosophila to sense magnetic fields. Magnetic fields were once reported to affect cryptochromes also in Arabidopsis thaliana plants: growth behavior seemed to be affected by magnetic fields in the presence of blue (but not red) light. Nevertheless, these results have later turned out to be irreproducible under strictly controlled conditions in another laboratory, suggesting that plant cryptochromes do not respond to magnetic fields.

Cryptochrome forms a pair of radicals with correlated spins when exposed to blue light. Radical pairs can also be generated by the light-independent dark reoxidation of the flavin cofactor by molecular oxygen through the formation of a spin-correlated FADH-superoxide radical pairs. Magnetoreception is hypothesized to function through the surrounding magnetic field's effect on the correlation (parallel or anti-parallel) of these radicals, which affects the lifetime of the activated form of cryptochrome. Activation of cryptochrome may affect the light-sensitivity of retinal neurons, with the overall result that the animal can sense the magnetic field. Animal cryptochromes and closely related animal (6-4) photolyases contain a longer chain of electron-transferring tryptophans than other proteins of the cryptochrome-photolyase superfamily (a tryptophan tetrad instead of a triad). The longer chain leads to a better separation and over 1000× longer lifetimes of the photoinduced flavin-tryptophan radical pairs than in proteins with a triad of tryptophans. The absence of spin-selective recombination of these radical pairs on the nanosecond to microsecond timescales seems to be incompatible with the suggestion that magnetoreception by cryptochromes is based on the forward light reaction.
