= DNA photolyase N-terminal domain =

InterPro Domain

DNA photolyase, N-terminal

Identifiers
- Symbol: DNA_photolyase
- Pfam: PF00875
- InterPro: IPR006050
- PROSITE: PDOC00331
- SCOP2: 1qnf / SCOPe / SUPFAM
Available protein structures:
- Pfam: structures / ECOD
- PDB: RCSB PDB; PDBe; PDBj
- PDBsum: structure summary

FeS-BCP

Identifiers
- Symbol: DPRP
- Pfam: PF04244
- InterPro: IPR007357
Available protein structures:
- Pfam: structures / ECOD
- PDB: RCSB PDB; PDBe; PDBj
- PDBsum: structure summary

DNA photolyase, N-terminal is an evolutionary conserved protein domain. This domain binds a light harvesting chromophore that enhanced the spectrum of photolyase or cryptochrome light absorption, i.e. an antenna. It adopts the Rossmann fold.

The cofactor may be either the pterin 5,10-Methenyltetrahydrofolate (MTHF, MHF) in folate photolyases (PDB: 4U63) or the deazaflavin 8-hydroxy-7,8-didemethyl-5-deazariboflavin (8-HDF, FO1) in deazaflavin photolyases (PDB: 3CVV, 4CDN). The 8-HDF ligand usually binds into this domain (next to the C-terminal half), while MHF tends to bind to an outside groove of this domain. A structural signature for 8-HDF binding has been produced, highlighting amino acid residues that determine which antenna a photolyase can use. Experiments on a Thermus thermophilus protein with this domain (P61497) shows that artificial substrates can be alternatively used for a modified absorption spectra. It naturally binds FMN in a pose similar to 8-HDF. In addition, many cryptochromes, especially those from animals, bind no cofactors at this domain.

Even though few eukaryotes (and no animals) can synthesize 8-HDF on their own, many lineages nevertheless use deazaflavin photolyases. They probably receive 8-HDF from their endosymbiotic microbes. Unlike many bacterial deazaflavin photolyases that accepts FMN as well as 8-HDF, one such enzyme from the fruit fly only accepts 8-HDF.

The FeS-BCP N-terminal domain is homologous to this domain. Instead of an organic cofactor, its chromophore is an iron-sulphur cluster.

== Examples ==
Human proteins containing this domain include:

- CRY1
- CRY2
