= 5,10-methylenetetrahydromethanopterin reductase =

InterPro Family

coenzyme F420-dependent N5,N10-methenyltetrahydromethanopterin reductase

Identifiers
- EC no.: 1.5.98.2

Databases
- IntEnz: IntEnz view
- BRENDA: BRENDA entry
- ExPASy: NiceZyme view
- KEGG: KEGG entry
- MetaCyc: metabolic pathway
- PRIAM: profile
- PDB structures: RCSB PDB PDBe PDBsum
- Gene Ontology: AmiGO / QuickGO
Search
- PMC: articles
- PubMed: articles
- NCBI: proteins

In enzymology, a 5,10-methylenetetrahydromethanopterin reductase (EC 1.5.98.2) is an enzyme that catalyzes the chemical reaction

5-methyltetrahydromethanopterin + coenzyme F_{420} $\rightleftharpoons$ 5,10-methylenetetrahydromethanopterin + reduced coenzyme F_{420}

Thus, the two substrates of this enzyme are 5-methyltetrahydromethanopterin and coenzyme F_{420}, whereas its two products are 5,10-methylenetetrahydromethanopterin and reduced coenzyme F_{420}.

This enzyme belongs to the family of oxidoreductases, specifically those acting on the CH-NH group of donors with other acceptors. The systematic name of this enzyme class is 5-methyltetrahydromethanopterin:coenzyme-F420 oxidoreductase. Other names in common use include 5,10-methylenetetrahydromethanopterin cyclohydrolase, N5,N10-methylenetetrahydromethanopterin reductase, methylene-H4MPT reductase, coenzyme F420-dependent N5,N10-methenyltetrahydromethanopterin, reductase, and N5,N10-methylenetetrahydromethanopterin:coenzyme-F420 oxidoreductase. This enzyme participates in folate biosynthesis.
