= (6-4)DNA photolyase =

Class of enzymes

Identifiers
- EC no.: 4.1.99.13
- CAS no.: 37290-70-3

Databases
- IntEnz: IntEnz view
- BRENDA: BRENDA entry
- ExPASy: NiceZyme view
- KEGG: KEGG entry
- MetaCyc: metabolic pathway
- PRIAM: profile
- PDB structures: RCSB PDB PDBe PDBsum
Search
- PMC: articles
- PubMed: articles
- NCBI: proteins

(6-4)DNA photolyase (EC 4.1.99.13, DNA photolyase, H64PRH, NF-10, phr (6-4), PL-(6-4), OtCPF1, (6-4) PHR, At64PHR) is an enzyme with systematic name (6-4) photoproduct pyrimidine-lyase.

This enzyme catalyses the following chemical reaction:

(6-4) photoproduct (in DNA) $\rightleftharpoons$ 2 pyrimidine residues (in DNA)

This enzyme is a flavoprotein.
