= Culture conversion =

- Purpose: Determine when tuberculosis is cured

Culture conversion is a diagnostic criteria indicating the point at which samples taken from a person infected with a tuberculosis can no longer produce tuberculosis cell cultures. Culture conversion is a positive prognostic marker indicating that a person is cured of, or is recovering from, tuberculosis.
