= Methanofuran =

Chemical compound

Structure of the methanofurans

Methanofurans (MFRs) are a family of chemical compounds found in methanogenic archaea. These species feature a 2-aminomethylfuran linked to phenoxy group. At least three different end groups are recognized: R = tricarboxyheptanoyl (methanofuran), glutamyl-glutamyl (methanofuran b), tricarboxy-2-hydroxyheptanoyl (methanofuran c, see picture).

== Formylation of MFR ==
Methanofuran converts to formylmethanofuran in an early stage of methanogenesis. The enzyme formylmethanofuran dehydrogenase (EC: 1.2.99.5) formylates methanofuran using CO_{2}, the primary C1 source in methanogenesis.

== Deformylation of MFR ==
The enzyme formylmethanofuran:tetrahydromethanopterin formyltransferase catalyzes the transfer of the formyl group from formylmethanofuran to N5 on tetrahydromethanopterin, H_{4}MPT. This enzyme has been crystallized; it contains no prosthetic group.
