= Coenzyme F420-0:L-glutamate ligase =

Class of enzymes

Coenzyme F_{420}-0:L-glutamate ligase

Identifiers
- EC no.: 6.3.2.31

Databases
- IntEnz: IntEnz view
- BRENDA: BRENDA entry
- ExPASy: NiceZyme view
- KEGG: KEGG entry
- MetaCyc: metabolic pathway
- PRIAM: profile
- PDB structures: RCSB PDB PDBe PDBsum
Search
- PMC: articles
- PubMed: articles
- NCBI: proteins

Coenzyme F_{420}-0:L-glutamate ligase (EC 6.3.2.31, CofE-AF, MJ0768, CofE) is an enzyme with systematic name L-glutamate:coenzyme F420-0 ligase (GDP-forming). This enzyme catalyses the following chemical reaction

GTP + coenzyme F420-0 + L-glutamate $\rightleftharpoons$ GDP + phosphate + coenzyme F420-1

In some instances, this enzyme is fused with a coenzyme F420-1:gamma-L-glutamate ligase domain, so that the produced coenzyme F420-1 is quickly ligated to coenzyme F420-2.
