= Coenzyme F420-1:gamma-L-glutamate ligase =

Class of enzymes

Coenzyme F_{420}-1:γ-L-glutamate ligase

Identifiers
- EC no.: 6.3.2.34

Databases
- IntEnz: IntEnz view
- BRENDA: BRENDA entry
- ExPASy: NiceZyme view
- KEGG: KEGG entry
- MetaCyc: metabolic pathway
- PRIAM: profile
- PDB structures: RCSB PDB PDBe PDBsum
Search
- PMC: articles
- PubMed: articles
- NCBI: proteins

Coenzyme F_{420}-1:γ-L-glutamate ligase (EC 6.3.2.34, F420:gamma-glutamyl ligase, CofE-AF, MJ0768, CofE) is an enzyme with systematic name L-glutamate:coenzyme F420-1 ligase (GDP-forming). This enzyme catalyses the following chemical reaction

GTP + coenzyme F_{420}-1 + L-glutamate $\rightleftharpoons$ GDP + phosphate + coenzyme γ-F_{420}-2

In some instances, this enzyme is fused with a coenzyme F420-0:L-glutamate ligase domain, so that the coenzyme F420-1 produced by the latter is quickly ligated to coenzyme F420-2. This enzyme is also able to serially add additional γ-glutamyl groups to F420-2, producing F420-3 and so on.
