= Operation ASHA =

Logo of Operation ASHA

Operation ASHA (OpASHA) is a non-profit organization (NGO) founded in 2006 to bring tuberculosis (TB) treatment at economically feasible rates to disadvantaged communities. The organization's primary work is to detect and cure TB, as well as to prevent and treat multidrug-resistant tuberculosis (MDR-TB) in India and Cambodia. Operation ASHA specializes in last-mile connectivity, bridging the gap between government medicine distribution centers and the communities of patients to deliver treatment at the doorsteps of the under-served. In addition to detecting and curing TB, OpASHA's community health workers also educate the community about TB and its symptoms thereby helping to reduce the stigma there is regarding the disease. In addition to TB, Operation ASHA's model and technology has been used in many other diseases such as diabetes, hemophilia and mental health.

Operation ASHA was founded by Dr. Shelly Batra and Sandeep Ahuja. In India, Operation ASHA works under the Revised National Tuberculosis Control Program as a private-sector DOTS-provider. Operation ASHA is a member of the Stop TB Partnership's Coordinating Board. In 2010, a collaboration with Microsoft Research developed eCompliance, a biometric terminal for monitoring TB patients.

== Founders' Bios ==
Dr. Shelly Batra is the President of Operation ASHA since 2005. She is Schwab Foundation's Social Entrepreneur of the Year 2014, renowned Senior Obstetrician and Gynecologist, Advanced Laparoscopy Surgeon. She is an advocate for better policies in TB across the world.

As CEO, Sandeep has led the organization since 2006. He was member of the Board of the Stop TB Partnership from 2009 to 2012 where he represented NGOs of developing countries. Before founding Operation ASHA, Sandeep served for many years as additional commissioner for the Government of India.

== Social model ==
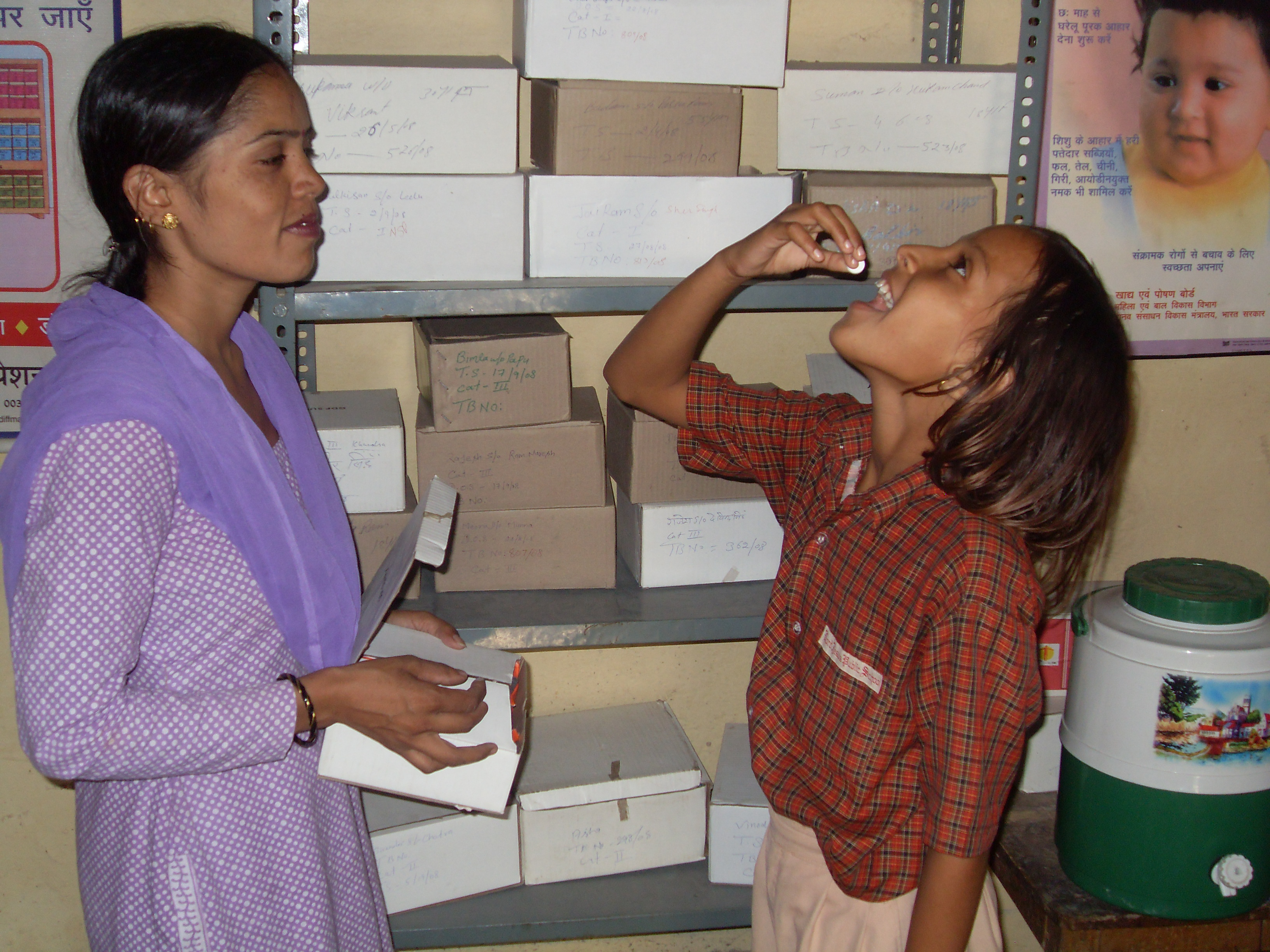
A community health worker for Operation ASHA gives a child medication for TB treatment at a TB Treatment Center in Haryana, Gurgaon.

Operation ASHA provides TB treatment through convenient DOTS clinics in familiar places like shops and temples to reduce stigma. They also offer mobile services in rural areas. By offering flexible hours and community-based care, they help patients, especially daily wage earners, complete treatment without missing work.

Operation ASHA stresses upon employing and training disadvantaged youths from the local community who understand the local culture and customs as TB-specific health workers. Two-thirds of Operation ASHA's staff is semi-literate/illiterate. Currently, Operation ASHA serves over 15 million people in India and Cambodia, with a team of over 250 field workers, 150 community partners, and over 4000 village workers.

In addition, people are employed in India in the field of haemophilia detection and care.

== Impact ==
Operation ASHA increases TB-detection rate by 50–400% within 6–18 month of starting work in any area. Also, DST-TB treatment default rate has been maintained at 3%, compared to 32% in a triangulation study in India.

As of 2016, Operation ASHA has treated a total of 75,719 patients of DST-TB in India (including 9,003 patients in Cambodia), 366 patients of MDR-TB, two patient of XDR-TB, and one patient of XXDR-TB. Another XDR-TB is also undergoing treatment in India. 342 haemophilia patients have been detected and started on treatment. Operation ASHA has also detected thousands of patients of diabetes, heart disease and depression, and is helping with the management of their health issues.

Following treatment, patients earn an additional $13,935 (Rs. 8.36 Lakh) on average through reinstated productivity in their lifetime (Annual TB Report 2013, Government of India). Thus, treated patients have benefited by a whopping $843 million (Rs. 5,485.3 Crore). Also, with treatment of each patient, the economy saves $12,235 (Rs 7.34 Lakh) in indirect losses (Annual TB Report 2013, Government of India). Thus, the Indian and Cambodian economies have saved a total of $740.9 million (Rs 4,816.1 Crore) for patients who have successfully completed the treatment.

Operation ASHA has also distributed millions of analgesic, antacid, antiemetic, iron and calcium tablets, condoms, Oral Rehydration Salts, protein supplements, in addition to 8 tons of food and 9000 blankets.

Till January 2021, a total of around 4930 patients had been enrolled and more than 105,550 supervised doses had been logged through eCompliance. The default rate had also been reduced to 1.5 percent, which is much less than that of other institutions. Additionally, the total cost of treating a patient is $80 in comparison to $300 among other NGOs. In year 2013, Operation ASHA's president, Dr. Shelly Batra, was chosen as Social Entrepreneur of the Year, in recognition of this innovative and effective methodology. In addition to combating tuberculosis and simultaneously addressing the effects of global poverty.

== Operation ASHA in India ==
In India, Operation ASHA serves 5.1 million people of the population, operating in the following Indian states for tuberculosis:

Delhi NCR (East Delhi, West Delhi, South Delhi), Madhya Pradesh (Bhopal, Khargone, Barwani-district, Indore, Khandwa, Vidisha, Gwalior), Maharashtra (Bhiwandi, Malegaon, Vasai), Odisha (Bhubhaneswar), Rajasthan (Jaipur), and Himachal Pradesh (Solan, Sirmour, Kullu, Mandi).

Operation ASHA's hemophilia centers are located in Haryana (Bhiwani, Hisar, Fatehabad, Sirsa) and Uttar Pradesh (Aligarh, Meerut and Lucknow).

== Operation ASHA in Cambodia ==
In Cambodia, Operation ASHA works closely with the National Tuberculosis Program, operating in 14 Operational Districts across 6 provinces and working with a total of 164 Health Centers. Overall, 15% (2.3 million) of Cambodia's population are provided with services by Operation ASHA.

Since starting operations in Dec 2010, when Operation ASHA opened its first short-course (DOTS) center in Phnom Penh, Cambodia, it has enrolled more than 11,500 patients for Tuberculosis treatment. Health care workers travel to villages on motor-bikes, carrying drugs and supplies. Health care team members approaches community members who exhibit Tuberculosis symptoms and administer medicines to patients in their homes.

Operation ASHA Cambodia Website: http://opashacambodia.org

== Research ==
In collaboration with Johns Hopkins-Economic Department and MIT-J-PAL, Operation ASHA studied incentivizing community health workers to determine if monetary rewards for finding new TB suspects will result in health workers identifying more TB patients that can then be treated, as well as preventing patients from default.

Operation ASHA worked with University College London (UCL) to study the detection of depression in TB patients and family members. If a correlation between adherence to treatment and depression is found as suspected, an intervention program similar to one used in the UK can be developed for India and implemented at a later stage of the study.

Operation ASHA was involved in a research project with University College London wherein TB specialist Dr. Marc Lipman and his team analyzed the eCompliance data for two years. It was accepted for a poster presentation for the International Union Against Tuberculosis and Lung Disease Conference 2016. There has also been a poster presentation at the British Thoracic Society on eCompliance titled "Utilizing Community Empowerment and Biometrics to Facilitate DOTS in Delhi Slum Populations: The Operation ASHA Model".

Operation ASHA conducted a randomized control trial (RCT) with MIT JPAL on whether use of biometrics give improved outcomes when used by community health workers or not.

Operation ASHA, Johns Hopkins, University of Maryland and University of Chicago are conducting an RCT to determine whether giving cash incentives to existing TB patients will encourage them to find others with symptoms and refer them to our program.

With support from the Bill and Melinda Gates Foundation, Operation ASHA and Center for Interdisciplinary Inquiry and Innovation in Sexual and Reproductive Health of University of Chicago are conducting workshops with underprivileged teens in Lucknow, Uttar Pradesh, India, to better understand the social determinants of adolescent health and well-being. The goal is to empower youth to develop strategies for improving gender equality and sexual and reproductive health.

TB and diabetes: Through a six-month pilot, Operation ASHA investigated the potential ways and means of establishing a sustainable model for diabetes management among TB patients.
