= Bhore =

Bhore may refer to:

- Bhore (Vidhan Sabha constituency), Indian assembly constituency in Bihar

== People with the name ==
- Joseph William Bhore (1878-1960), Indian civil servant
- Alex Bhore, American musician, member of This Will Destroy You band

== See also ==
- Bhore Committee, 1943 committee in India on health issues, chaired by Joseph Bhore
- Bhore Ghaut, mountain pass in Maharashtra, India
