= Sanjeev Krishna =

British parasitologist

Sanjeev Krishna, FMedSci, is a British physician and parasitologist whose research focuses on affordable diagnosis and treatment of diseases such as COVID-19, malaria, Ebola, African trypanosomiasis, leishmaniasis, and colorectal cancer. Krishna is Professor of Medicine and Molecular Parasitology at St George's, University of London and St George's Hospital. In recent years, Krishna has led international initiatives focused on affordable diagnostics and therapeutics in low and middle-income countries, alongside academic appointments in Southeast Asia and Europe.

== Early life and education ==
Sanjeev Krishna was born in Tanzania and attended a primary school run by English Catholic nuns. He expressed interest in medicine from an early age. His family operated a clinic where Krishna was first introduced to medicine. In 1969, at 11 years old, he went to boarding school at King's College in Taunton, England. In 1976, he won a scholarship to Pembroke College, University of Cambridge, to read Natural Sciences. He then completed his medical degree from University of Oxford in 1982. Krishna later earned his Doctor of Science degree from the University of Cambridge in 2007.

== Career and research ==
After completing his postgraduate medical training, in 1985, Krishna began research towards a DPhil at the Weatherall Institute of Molecular Medicine in Oxford as a training fellow funded by the Medical Research Council. In 1994, he was awarded a Wellcome Trust Senior Research Fellowship in Clinical Science at St George's, University of London. He was later appointed Professor of Molecular Parasitology and Medicine at St George's, University of London and St George's Hospital.

Krishna has been studying malaria since the early 1980s. He has also studied a number of other infectious diseases including African trypanosomiasis and leishmaniasis. Krishna has made significant contributions to the understanding of membrane transporters in Plasmodium falciparum, a parasite that causes malaria, and identifying them as targets for pharmaceuticals. He pinpointed an inhibitor with efficacy in killing P. falciparum in cultures and animal models by targeting a hexose transporter his group was able to identify, clone, and study. In 2001, Krishna et al. also identified a P-type ATPase (PfATP4) in P. falciparum as a target for new drugs. In 2017, Krishna co-authored the living reference work, Encyclopaedia of Malaria, the "most comprehensive reference work devoted to one of humanity’s oldest and most persistent diseases."

Krishna was a lead professor on the St George's University of London's Nanomal Project which began in 2012 to develop a point-of-care, affordable diagnostic device used to detect malaria infection and assay the drug resistance of the parasites. In 2015, Krishna and his team launched a crowd-funded study at St George's University of London looking at the efficacy of artesunate, an antimalarial drug, as a treatment for colorectal cancer. He also contributed to the development of vaccines for Ebola which were shown to be safe and effective in clinical trials by 2017, following the Ebola virus epidemic in West Africa that killed more than 11,000 people.

During the COVID-19 pandemic, St George's Hospital shifted all its research to focus on COVID-19 with Krishna and his colleague Tim Planche leading a diagnostics project. He was also involved in a study on how some people exposed to COVID-19 develop antibodies to the virus that causes the disease for almost two months after they are diagnosed. The study co-authored by Krishna found that between 2% and 8.5% of COVID-19 patients in the study did not test positive for COVID-19 antibodies.

== Memberships and honours ==
In 2004, Krishna was inducted a Fellow of the Academy of Medical Sciences. He serves or has served on advisory committees of the World Health Organization (WHO), the United States National Institutes of Health, Wellcome Trust, and as an advisor to the Foundation for Innovative New Diagnostics. Krishna also serves on the Guidelines Development Group for malaria chemotherapy at the WHO Global Malaria Programme. He also holds an Honorary Professorship at the University of Glasgow, reflecting long-standing contributions to teaching and collaborative research in tropical medicine, including involvement in postgraduate training.

== Personal life ==
In 1999, Krishna married his wife Yasmin, who initially worked in finance and later became a teacher. They have a son Karim, born in 2000.

Krishna is an avid amateur squash player.

== Selected publications ==
- Krishna, Sanjeev; Eckstein-Ludwig, Ursula; et al. (August 2003). "Artemisinins target the SERCA of Plasmodium falciparum". Nature. 424 (6951): 957–961. Bibcode:2003Natur.424..957E. doi:10.1038/nature01813. PMID 12931192. S2CID 4408172.
- —; Gomes, Melba F.; et al. (February 2009). "Pre-referral rectal artesunate to prevent death and disability in severe malaria: a placebo-controlled trial". The Lancet. 373 (9663): 557–566. doi:10.1016/S0140-6736(08)61734-1. PMC 2646124. PMID 19059639.
- —; Price, Ric N.; et al. (July 2004). "Mefloquine resistance in Plasmodium falciparum and increased pfmdr1 gene copy number". The Lancet. 364 (9432): 438–447. doi:10.1016/S0140-6736(04)16767-6. PMC 4337987. PMID 15288742.
- —; Sidhu, Amar Bir Singh; et al. (August 2006). "Decreasing pfmdr1 Copy Number in Plasmodium falciparum Malaria Heightens Susceptibility to Mefloquine, Lumefantrine, Halofantrine, Quinine, and Artemisinin". The Journal of Infectious Diseases. 194 (4): 528–535. doi:10.1086/507115. PMC 2978021. PMID 16845638.
- —; Slavic, Ksenija; et al. (April 2016). "A vacuolar iron-transporter homologue acts as a detoxifier in Plasmodium". Nature Communications. 7 (1) 10403. Bibcode:2016NatCo...710403S. doi:10.1038/ncomms10403. ISSN 2041-1723. PMC 4735874. PMID 26786069.
- —; Agnandji, Selidji T.; et al. (April 2016). "Phase 1 Trials of rVSV Ebola Vaccine in Africa and Europe". New England Journal of Medicine. 374 (17): 1647–1660. doi:10.1056/NEJMoa1502924. ISSN 0028-4793. PMC 5490784. PMID 25830326.
- —; Wang, Jigang; et al. (July 2017). "Mechanistic Investigation of the Specific Anticancer Property of Artemisinin and Its Combination with Aminolevulinic Acid for Enhanced Anticolorectal Cancer Activity". ACS Central Science. 3 (7): 743–750. doi:10.1021/acscentsci.7b00156. ISSN 2374-7943. PMC 5532725. PMID 28776016.
- —; Wang, Jigang; et al. (April 2020). "Preparedness is essential for malaria-endemic regions during the COVID-19 pandemic". The Lancet. 395 (10230): 1094–1096. doi:10.1016/S0140-6736(20)30561-4. PMC 7158917. PMID 32192582.
