= Millennium Foundation =

Swiss non-profit organization

- Founded: 2008
- Purpose: Health: HIV/AIDS, Malaria, Tuberculosis
- Location: Geneva, Switzerland
- Region served: Global
- Method: Innovative financing
- Website: Official Website

The Millennium Foundation for Innovative Finance for Health is an independent, non-profit Swiss organization, established in November 2008 in order to create new ways to finance health systems in low- and middle-income countries. Based in Geneva, Switzerland, the Millennium Foundation aims to ensure that international commitments on improving health care are met through the development of innovative financing projects. Its first such project – called MassiveGood – was launched on 4 March, and will give travelers the possibility to add a $2, £2 or €2 micro-contribution to the purchase of a travel reservation, with all proceeds going to the fight against HIV/AIDS, malaria and tuberculosis.

== Mission and Activities ==
In 2000 the United Nations agreed to achieve eight international development goals by the year 2015, called the Millennium Development Goals (MDGs). Three of these goals are health related – to treat and fight life-threatening diseases, including HIV/AIDS, malaria and tuberculosis; to reduce childhood mortality; and to improve maternal health. Despite repeated commitments to the three health-related MDGs and increased funding available for development, HIV/AIDS, malaria and tuberculosis still have appalling human and economic consequences in developing countries. Official Development Assistance has been increasing in the past few years but cannot keep up with the damage done by the economic crisis on low- and middle-income countries. In order to bridge this financing gap, the international community has looked into new funding mechanisms. The Taskforce on Innovative International Funding for Health Systems issued in June 2009 a report acknowledging the potential of innovative sources of funding: Innovative Financing projects that have sprouted up in the past decade include Product Red, the International Finance Facility for Immunization, the Global Fund, the GAVI and UNITAID. UNITAID is funded by a small tax on airlines tickets levied in 12 countries and budgetary contributions from 17 countries. Since 2006, UNITAID has committed over US$730 million to support 16 projects in 93 countries.

== MassiveGood ==
MassiveGood, the Millennium Foundation's first innovative finance project, was unveiled at the United Nations General Assembly on 23 September 2009 during a meeting of the Task Force for Innovative Finance for Health, spearheaded by UK Prime Minister Gordon Brown and World Bank President Robert Zoellick. The original idea was conceived by Jean-François Rial, the head of a French travel agency, after officials from George W. Bush's administration rejected the idea of a tax on airline tickets in the United States. MassiveGood gave travelers the option to make a $2, €2 or £2 micro-contribution towards major global health causes when they bought an airline ticket, reserved a hotel room, rented a car, or travel product. Funds were used to provide drugs to reduce child mortality, improve maternal health and combat HIV/AIDS, malaria and tuberculosis.

These contributions went to the Spanish Red Cross and UNITAID, which has a wide range of partners in developing countries including the Clinton Foundation, UNICEF, the World Health Organization, UNAIDS, the Global Fund, the Roll Back Malaria (RBM) Partnership, Stop TB Partnership and the Foundation for Innovative New Diagnostics. Additional funding was aimed towards improving maternal and child health in the developing world. Supporters of the project included Bill Clinton, will.i.am, Samuel L. Jackson, Susan Sarandon, David Guetta, Spike Lee, Mary J. Blige, Yvonne Chaka Chaka, Paul Auster and Brian Greene.

MassiveGood was launched on 4 March 2010 in the US, and successfully rolled out in Spain in June 2010. It was discontinued by the Board of the Millennium Foundation on 4 November 2011, citing insufficient returns "for such a micro-philanthropy initiative in today’s economic climate".

== Structure ==
The Millennium Foundation is a public-private initiative governed by a Board composed of representatives of participating Governments, such as the United Kingdom, France, Norway, Brazil, Chile, the Republic of Korea and a representative of the African Union; representatives of NGOs working on malaria, tuberculosis or HIV/AIDS and of communities living with diseases; and representatives of the Gates Foundation and of the private sector. The UN World Health Organization serves on the board as an observer. The Board of the Millennium Foundation is chaired by Dr. Philippe Douste-Blazy, who currently serves as Special Adviser on Innovative Financing for Development to the United Nations Secretary-General Ban Ki-moon, and also acts as Chairman of the Board of UNITAID. Mr. Henk Mulder is the Managing Director and leads the strategic vision for the Foundation.

== See also ==
- UNITAID
- WHO
- UNICEF
- Clinton Foundation
- Stop TB Partnership
- UNAIDS
- Global Fund
- The Bill and Melinda Gates Foundation
- Foundation for Innovative New Diagnostics
