= Margaret Stott Bhore =

British missionary

Margaret Stott Bhore OBE
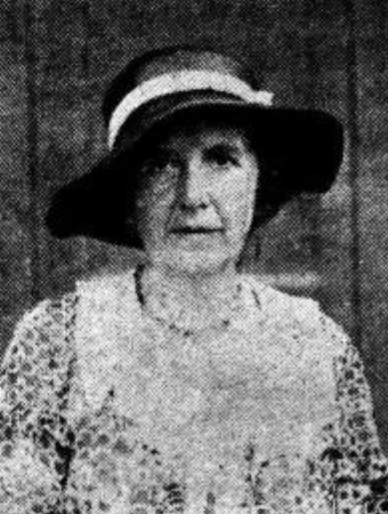
- Margaret, Lady Bhore, from a 1935 newspaper
- Born: Margaret Wilkie Stott; 20 June 1884; Dundee, Scotland, UK
- Died: 30 December 1945 (aged 61); Bhopal
- Other name: Lady Bhore
- Occupations: Physician, missionary, philanthropist
- Spouse: Sir Joseph William Bhore

Margaret Wilkie Bhore OBE (née Stott; 20 June 1884 – 30 December 1945), also known as Lady Bhore, was a Scottish physician, missionary, and philanthropist in India. She was the wife of Indian civil servant Sir Joseph William Bhore.

== Early life and education ==
Margaret Wilkie Stott was born on 20 June 1884 in Dundee, the daughter of Joseph Stott. Her father was a cabinet maker and upholsterer. She attended the Morgan Academy and earned a medical degree at St. Andrews University in Dundee in 1907. Her training focused on materia medica, pathology, forensic medicine, and public health.

== Career ==
Stott worked as an assistant physician in Preston for a year, then went to India in 1908, to be medical officer at the Baptist Mission Hospital in Berhampore. She lived in Delhi, where she served on civic committees and charity boards for health, especially maternal and child welfare, and on anti-tuberculosis efforts. She worked with the YWCA and the Red Cross. She was on governing boards of the Lady Irwin College for Girls and the Lady Hardinge Medical College in Delhi. She accompanied her husband on tours and visits for his government work. The couple represented India in the procession of carriages at the Imperial Silver Jubilee celebrations in London in 1935. During World War II, she was active in addressing the needs of soldiers' families in Bhopal.

Lady Bhore was awarded the Delhi Durbar Medal in 1911. She was awarded the MBE in 1919, for her wartime work in Cochin. She received the gold Kaisar-i-Hind Medal in 1934, and was elevated to the OBE in 1944.

== Personal life ==
Margaret Stott married Indian civil servant Joseph William Bhore in 1911. They had two children. She died in 1945, in Bhopal. There is a Lady Bhore Urban Health and Training Centre in Bhopal, named in her memory. The actress Jiggy Bhore is her granddaughter.
