= Tuberculosis in India =

Infectious disease and significant cause of mortality in India

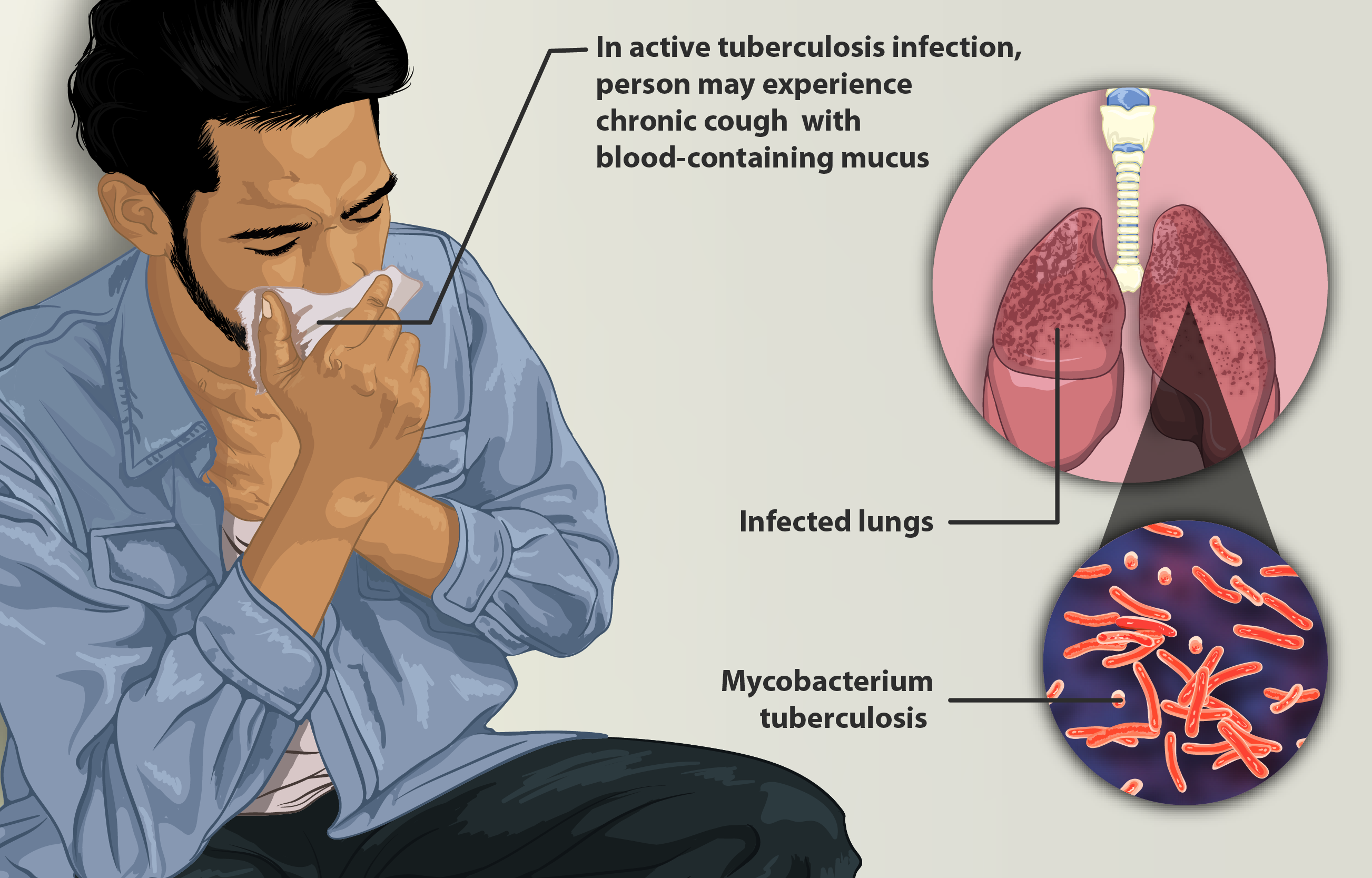
tuberculosis patient

Tuberculosis in India is a major health problem, causing about 220,000 deaths every year. In 2020, the Indian government made statements to eliminate tuberculosis from the country by 2025 through its National TB Elimination Program. Interventions in this program include major investment in health care, providing supplemental nutrition credit through the Nikshay Poshan Yojana, organizing a national epidemiological survey for tuberculosis, and organizing a national campaign to tie together the Indian government and private health infrastructure for the goal of eliminating the disease.

India bears a disproportionately large burden of the world's tuberculosis rates, with World Health Organization (WHO) statistics for 2022 estimating 2.8 million new infections annually, accounting for 26% of the global total. It is estimated that approximately 40% of the population of India carry tuberculosis infection.

The cost of this death and disease to the Indian economy between 2006 and 2014 was approximately US$1 billion.

== Epidemiology ==
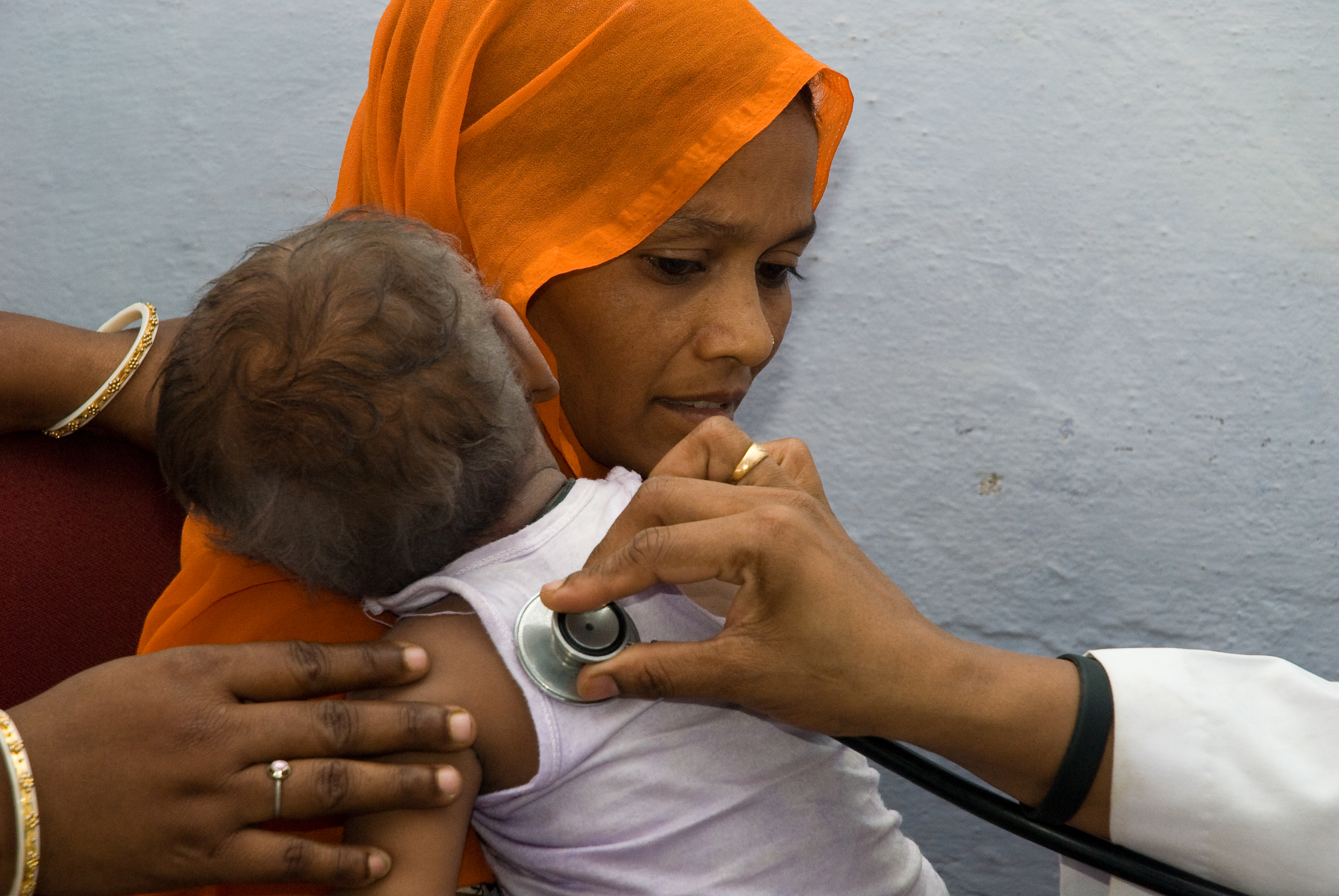
Children have special needs both in preventing and treating tuberculosis.

Tuberculosis is one of India's major public health problems. According to World Health Organization (WHO) estimates, India has the world's largest tuberculosis epidemic. In 2020, India accounted for 26% of the incident TB cases across the globe. India has incidence rate of 192 cases per 100,000 of population. India accounted for 38% of global TB deaths among HIV-negative people and for 34% of the combined total number of TB deaths in HIV-negative and HIV-positive people. Further in 2020, India accounted for 24% of global gap between estimated TB incidence and the number of people newly diagnosed with TB and reported. Many research studies have investigated the effects and consequences of TDR-TB, especially in India, where social and economic development is still in progress. A report by Zarir Udwadia, originating from studies at the Hinduja Hospital in Mumbai, discusses the drug-resistant effects and results. An experiment was conducted in January 2012 on four patients to test how resistant and unique the "new category" of TDR-TB is. These patients were given all the first-line drugs and second-line drugs that usually are prescribed to treat tuberculosis, and were resistant to all. As a response, the government of India appeared to stay in denial, while the WHO decided that although patterns of drug-resistance were evident, there was insufficient evidence to create a new category of TDR-TB from these results.

Compared to India, Canada has about 1,600 new cases of TB every year. Citing studies of TB-drug sales, the government of India now suggests the total has gone from being 2.2 million to 2.6 million people nationwide. On March 24, 2019, TB Day, the Ministry of Health & Family Welfare of India notified that 2.15 million new tuberculosis patients were discovered only in 2018.

In India, tuberculosis is responsible for the death of every third AIDS patient. Moreover, India accounts for about a quarter of the global tuberculosis burden. The ministry reiterated their commitment to eliminating tuberculosis in the country by 2025. As part of its efforts to eliminate tuberculosis, the Union Government changed the name of Revised National Tuberculosis Control Program (RNTCP) to National Tuberculosis Elimination Program (NTEP) on December 30, 2019.

According to the WHO's Global Tuberculosis Report 2026, released in November 2026, tuberculosis deaths in India fell by 38 per cent between 2015 and 2025, with 2.63 lakh deaths reported in 2025 and the TB death rate falling from 28 to 18 per lakh people over the same period.

== Cause and symptoms ==
The bacterium that causes TB is called mycobacterium tuberculosis. A person can unknowingly acquire this bacteria and have it lie dormant within them, a condition known as inactive tuberculosis. Active tuberculosis begins when the bacteria starts developing, and the signs and symptoms begin to be visible. Although the TB bacteria can infect any organ (e.g., kidney, lymph nodes, bones, joints) in the body, the disease commonly occurs in the lungs. Around 80% of all TB cases are related to pulmonary or lung.

Common symptoms include: coughing (that lasts longer than 3 weeks with green, yellow, or bloody sputum), weight loss, fatigue, fever, night sweats, chills, chest pain, shortness of breath, and loss of appetite.

== Additional causes ==
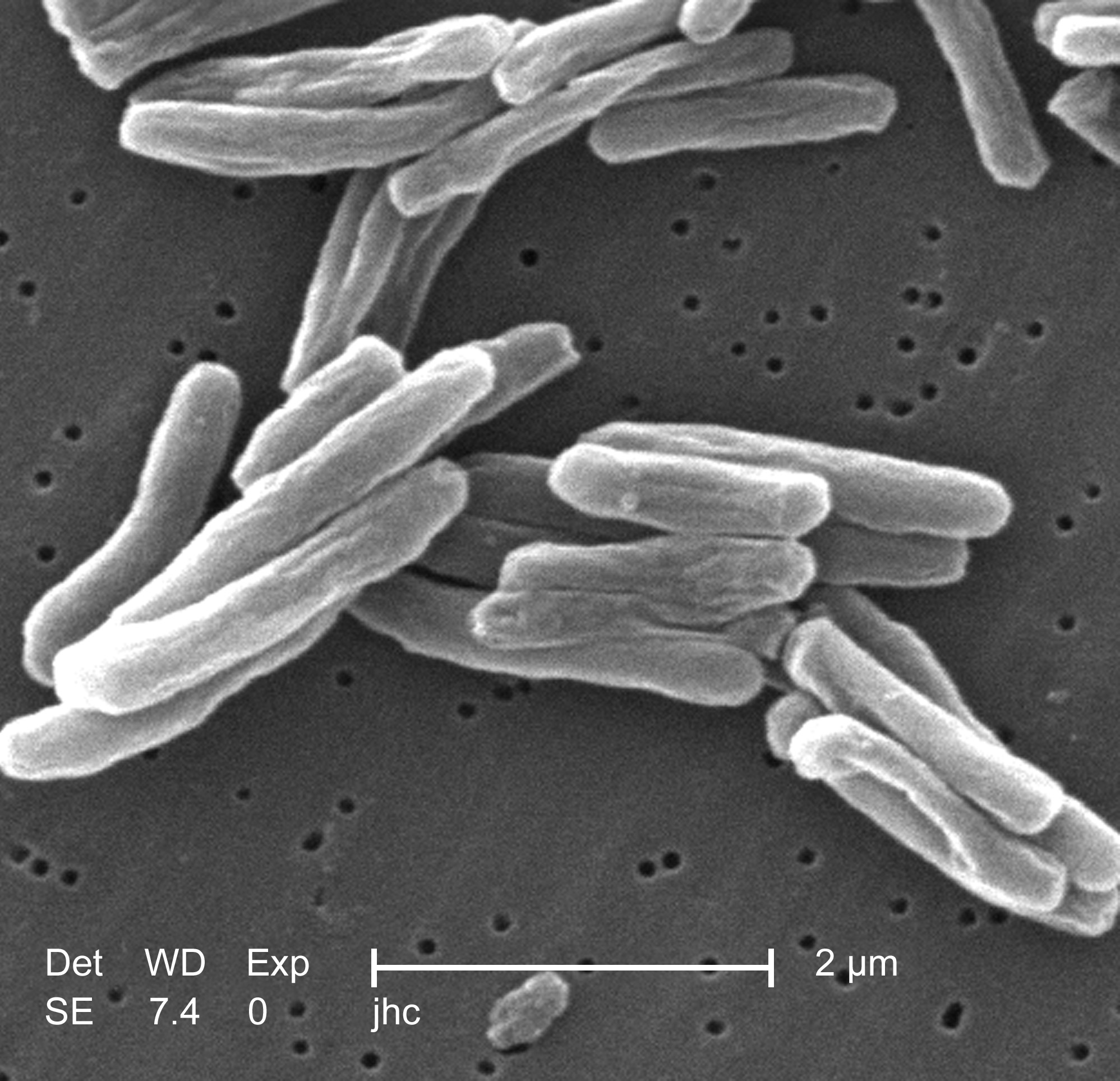
Scanning electron micrograph of Mycobacterium tuberculosis

Susceptibility to tuberculosis is heightened by a weak immune system. That is why babies, children, and senior adults have a higher risk of developing TB. The bacterium spreads in the air sacs and passes into the lungs. Coughing, sneezing, and even talking to someone can release the mycobacterium into the air, and a person's chances of becoming infected are higher in countries where TB is common and where there is a big proportion of homeless people. India, having the most TB cases of any country, clearly falls into this category.

=== Socioeconomic Dimensions of TB ===
Local decreases in the incidence of tuberculosis in India correlate with improvements in social and economic determinants of health more than with access to quality treatment. In India, pollution is widespread throughout the country. Pollution causes many effects in the air that people breathe, and since TB can be passed from person to person through the air, the chances of catching TB remain high in many parts of India.

=== Lack of infrastructure ===
Another major cause for the growth of TB in India has to do with its standing as a developing country. A study of Delhi slums has shown that lower scores on the Human Development Index and high proportions of one-room dwellings tend to correlate with TB at higher rates. Poorly built environments, including hazards in the workplace, poor ventilation, and overcrowded homes have also been found to increase exposure to TB.

=== Lack of access to treatment ===
Another major reason for the high incidence of TB in India is because the majority of those infected are not able to afford the treatment drugs prescribed. "At present, only the 1.5 million patients already under the Indian government's care get free treatments for regular TB. That leaves patients who seek treatment in India's growing private sector to buy drugs for themselves, and most struggle to do that, government officials say." Although the latest phase of the state-run tuberculosis eradication program, the Revised National Tuberculosis Control Program (RNTCP), has focused on increasing access to TB care for poor people, the majority of poor people still cannot access TB care financially. "It is estimated that just 16% of patients with drug-resistant TB are receiving appropriate treatment". To combat this huge problem, India has begun a new program to try to provide free drugs to all those infected in the country.

While RNTCP has created schemes to offer free or subsidized, high quality TB care, less than 1% of private practitioners have become fully involved. This is exacerbated by a lack of education and background information which practitioners and professionals hold for prescribing drugs, or those private therapy sessions. A study conducted in Mumbai by Udwadia, Amale, Ajbani, and Rodrigues, showed that only 5 of 106 private practitioners practicing in a crowded area called Dharavi could prescribe a correct prescription for a hypothetical patient with MDR-TB. Because the majority of TB cases are treated by private providers, and because the majority of poor people access informal (private) providers, the RNTCP's goals for universal access to TB care may have difficulty being met.

=== Poor health ===
Poverty and a lack of financial resources are also associated with malnutrition, poor housing conditions, substance misuse, and HIV/AIDS incidence. These factors often contribute to a weakened immune system and are accordingly correlated with a higher susceptibility to TB. They also tend to have a greater impact on people from high incidence countries such as India. Indeed, addressing these factors may have a stronger correlation with decreased TB incidence than removing the financial burdens associated with care. Yet, the RNTCP's treatment protocols do not address these social determinants of health.

== Treatment ==
Although tuberculosis is on the rise in India, treatment for it is also on the rise. To prevent spreading TB, it is important to get help quickly and to follow the treatment from your doctor through to completion. This can stop transmission of the bacteria and the appearance of antibiotic-resistant strains. Bacterial infections like tuberculosis require antibiotics for treatment and prevention; thus, commonly, you will see that patients diagnosed with tuberculosis have certain pills and antibiotics carried around with them. The antibiotics most commonly used include isoniazid, rifampin, pyrazinamide, and ethambutol.The treatment under the National TB Elimination Program (NTEP) in India consists of a 2 (HRZE)/4(HRE) anti-TB regime wherein INH, Rifampicin, Pyrazinamide, and ethambutol are given for an initial two months(intensive phase) followed by four months of INH, Rifampicin and Ethambutol. This treatment is a daily Fixed-dose combination-based treatment regime. It is crucial for a patient to take the medication that their doctor prescribes and to continue taking it for the full course of the treatment (which may last for months or even years). This will help to ward off types of TB bacteria that are antibiotic-resistant, which take longer and are more difficult to treat. In India, the majority of infections are of a type that is resistant to regular antibiotic treatment (MDR-TB, XDR-TB, TDR-TB); therefore, rather than one or two medications, a combination of different medications will be prescribed over a course of between 18 and 24 months, depending on how deep the infection is. Since the 1960s two drugs, isoniazid and rifampicin, have been the standard TB treatment. In addition to antibiotics, a vaccine is available to limit the spread of bacteria after TB infection. This vaccine is generally used in countries or communities where the risk of TB infection is greater than 1% each year, which includes parts of India. In the past, treatment modalities in the public sector in India did have some drawbacks. However, recently there has been a significant improvement in TB healthcare services in the public sector. The National TB Elimination Program (NTEP) in India has broadened its spectrum, in addition to providing free diagnostic and treatment services for drug sensitive as well as drug resistant forms of tuberculosis. The program is currently also targeting the TB Preventive therapy in vulnerable population with TB infection, who are at an increased risk of progressing to active TB disease.

70-80% of TB patients first visit the private sector, where the diagnostic and treatment services of TB are suboptimal and need to be improved. Quantified by PRAMAN India study, 53.3 % of anti-TB prescriptions prescribed in the non-programmatic settings in India are estimated to be incorrect. Similarly, the burden of incorrect anti-TB prescriptions has been estimated by the study to be 2 to 3 million annually, which translates to 4 to 5 incorrect anti-TB prescriptions per minute. Directly observed therapy (DOT) has been helpful to increase adherence and reduce resistance. In recent years, as smartphone usage and accessibility to low-cost internet services have gained traction in India, perceptions of alternative services such as SMS reminders, voice calls and video DOT (vDOT) have been explored and shown to be acceptable to a variety of patient population thus saving time and money.

== History ==
India's response to TB has changed with time and with the increasing sophistication of technology. Responses to TB have evolved, from pre-independence through post-independence to the current WHO-assisted period. The first national study of tuberculosis was carried out by Arthur Lankester in 1914.

Following Independence, the Indian government established various regional and national TB reduction programmes. The Indian government's Revised National TB Control Programme (RNTCP) started in India during 1997. The program used the WHO-recommended Directly Observed Treatment Short Course (DOTS) strategy to develop ideas and data on TB treatment. This group's initial objective was to achieve and maintain a TB treatment success rate of at least 85% in India among new patients. "In 2010 the RNTCP made a major policy decision that it would change focus and adopt the concept of Universal Access to quality diagnosis and TB treatment for all TB patients". By doing so, they offered a helping hand to all people diagnosed with TB, by providing better quality services and improvement in therapy for these patients.

The contemporary response to TB includes India's participation and leadership in global TB reduction and elimination programs. Treatment recommendations from Udwadia, et al. suggest that patients with TDR-TB only be treated "within the confines of government-sanctioned DOTS-Plus Programs to prevent the emergence of this untreatable form of tuberculosis". Given this conclusion by Udawadai, et al., it is considered certain, as of 2012, that the new Indian government program will insist on providing drugs free of charge to TB patients of India, for the first time ever.

== Society and culture ==
=== Organizations ===
The Tuberculosis Association of India is a voluntary organization that was set up in February 1939. It is affiliated to the government of India and is working with the TB Delhi center.

=== Laboratories ===
The Revised National Tuberculosis Control Program (RNTCP) has established a network of laboratories where TB tests can be done for purposes of diagnosis and to determine whether a person has drug-resistant TB. The laboratory system comprises the National Reference Laboratories (NRLs), state level Intermediate Reference Laboratories (IRLs), Culture & Drug Susceptibility Testing (C & DST) laboratories and Designated Microscopy Centres (DMCs). Some private laboratories are also accredited as Culture & Drug Susceptibility Testing laboratories for tuberculosis (i.e. Microcare Laboratory & tuberculosis Research Centre, Surat)

=== Stigma ===
Disempowerment and stigma are often experienced by TB patients as they are disproportionately impoverished or socially marginalized. The DOTS treatment regimen of the RNTCP is thought to deepen this sentiment, as its close monitoring of patients can lead to stigma. To counteract disempowerment, some countries have engaged patients in the process of implementing the DOTS and in creating other treatment regimens that give more attention to their nonclinical needs. This knowledge can complement the clinical care provided by the DOTS. Pro-poor strategies, including wage compensation for time lost to treatment, working with civil society organizations to link low income patients to social services, nutritional support, and offering local NGOs and committees a platform for engagement with the work done by private providers may reduce the burden of TB and lead to greater patient autonomy.

=== Economics ===
Some legal advocates have argued that public interest litigation in India must be part of the TB response strategy to ensure that available resources actually fund the necessary health response. India has a large burden of the world's TB, with an estimated economic cost of US$100 million lost annually due to this disease.Widening funding gap is a critical challenge to India's TB response currently. People with TB in India do incur significant out of pocket expenses for the diagnosis and treatment of TB. As reported by a recent research study,the average cost of TB care borne by the patient in India is INR 20,674 per patient, and nearly 2/3rd of this amount , about INR 12,767, was related to indirect costs such as lost wages and reduced productivity.

=== Special populations ===
How Scheduled Tribes and other Adivasi are coping with TB highlights a lack of research and understanding of the health of this demographic. There is a belief that this community is more vulnerable and has less access to treatment, but details are lacking on how TB affects tribal communities.

== Further consideration ==
- Central TB Division (March 2020). "India TB Report 2020". tbcindia.gov.in. Ministry of Health and Family Welfare.
- WHO Stop TB Department (2010). "A Brief History of Tuberculosis Control in India". World Health Organization.
