= Molbio Diagnostics =

Indian medical diagnostics company

Molbio Diagnostics Limited is an Indian medical diagnostics company headquartered in Verna, Goa, that develops molecular diagnostic technologies. Founded in 2000, the company developed the Truenat platform, a portable real-time PCR system used to diagnose infectious diseases including tuberculosis, HIV, and hepatitis.

The Truenat platform is recognized by the World Health Organization (WHO) for the initial detection of tuberculosis and rifampicin resistance. Following clinical studies, including research published in The Lancet, the technology has been adopted by national health programs in over 85 countries.

In 2025, Molbio was awarded the Kochon Prize by the Stop TB Partnership, the world's largest award for tuberculosis.

== History and operations ==
Incorporated in October 2000 in Goa, India, Molbio Diagnostics initially developed reagents for in vitro diagnostics. Its work in molecular diagnostics began through a collaboration with Bigtec Labs, a Bengaluru-based research firm specializing in lab-on-a-chip technologies. In 2011, the two entities formed a joint venture to commercialize the Truenat platform, and in 2015, Bigtec Labs merged into Molbio, functioning as its research and development unit.

In 2017, following the acquisition of Tulip Diagnostics by PerkinElmer, Natarajan exited that firm and focused on Molbio's operations. In the same year, Truenat was validated for use under India's National TB Elimination Programme. A fully automated version of the platform was released in 2018 and was deployed by the Indian Council of Medical Research during the 2018 Nipah virus outbreak in Kerala.

Between 2019 and 2020, Molbio received regulatory licenses from the Central Drugs Standard Control Organisation for multiple PCR-based diagnostic assays, including tests for tuberculosis, HIV, hepatitis, and COVID-19. During the COVID-19 pandemic, its COVID-19 diagnostic tests were used for decentralized testing at transit hubs and rural healthcare centers. In 2022, Molbio reached a valuation exceeding $1 billion following an $85 million investment from Temasek Holdings.

In March 2023, the company partnered with Global Fund and USAID to expand global access to its portable molecular TB tests. In 2025, Molbio was awarded the Kochon Prize by the Stop TB Partnership, becoming the first private sector recipient of the award. The recognition was granted for the company's role in decentralizing TB diagnostics in low-resource settings. As of 2025, the company reported exporting its diagnostic products to over 85 countries and formally converted into a public limited company.

== Technology and products ==
The Truenat platform is a battery-operated, real-time PCR system designed for point-of-care testing. It uses automated nucleic acid extraction and is capable of operating without a stable power supply. As of 2025, the platform supports over 40 assays for diseases including malaria, HIV, and human papillomavirus (HPV). In April 2025, Molbio launched India's first indigenously developed HPV test kits for cervical cancer screening, validated by AIIMS and the WHO's International Agency for Research on Cancer.

=== Radiology and digital pathology ===
Following its acquisition of Prognosys Medical Systems in 2022, Molbio entered the portable radiology segment with the ProRad Atlas Ultra X-ray system. In 2024–2025, the company invested in the San Jose-based digital pathology firm OptraScan, expanding its portfolio into whole-slide imaging technologies. Through a partnership with UE LifeSciences, Molbio also distributes the iBreastExam handheld device for breast cancer screening.
