= Bernard Salome =

Swiss economist

Bernard Salomé is a Swiss economist.

== Biography ==
An economist by training, Dr. Salomé received his doctorate in Economic Development from Université Paris Sorbonne in 1984. Early in his career, Dr. Salomé worked on education and human resources projects for the Africa and Asia divisions of the World Bank, as well as the Deputy Director of the G7 Support Implementation Group in Moscow, where he designed a complete information system used by all embassies and donor agencies for external aid to Russia (technical assistance, humanitarian aid, export credit, and budget support). From 2009 to 2010, Dr. Bernard Salomé was the Managing Director of the Millennium Foundation for Innovative Finance for Health, thanks to his experience in international development, economics and policy. Prior to his work with the Millennium Foundation, he was the Director of the Voluntary Solidarity Contribution project within the Cabinet of the Political Advisor of the President of France. He also previously served as the Head of Secretariat, Extractive Industries Review (EIR) – World Bank, from 2001–2003, and in the late nineties, was assigned by the European Commission to the UNMIK in Kosovo, as the Head of the Economic Policy Office of UNMIK, and he was the main strategic Advisor on economic and social issues to the Special Representative of the Secretary-General, Dr. Bernard Kouchner. He is the author of eight books on development issues and seven World Bank reports.

== Career ==
- November 2008 – December 2010, Geneva Switzerland, Millennium Foundation for Innovative Finance for Health, Managing Director
- November 2007 - November 2008, Paris France, Cabinet of the Political Advisor of the President of France and of the President of the Executive Board of Unitaid, Director, Voluntary Solidarity Contribution Project
- October 2003 - December 2008, Alexandria Egypt, Bibliotheca Alexandrina, Special Advisor to the Director,
- August 2001 - June 2003, Washington DC USA and Jakarta Indonesia, World Bank – Secretariat of the Review of Extractive Industries, Head of Secretariat. Established upon the request of civil society, this independent secretariat was responsible for the dialogue between actors involved in development and the principal decision-makers in extractive industries.
- October 1999 - April 2001, Kosovo, United Nations Mission in Kosovo (UNMIK), Office of the Special Representative of the United Nations Secretary-General in Kosovo, Director, Office of Economic Policy. Under Resolution 1244 of the UN Security Council, this mission's objective is to provide temporary administration and reconcile conflict between different groups.
- February 1999 - September 1999, Brussels Belgium, European Commission – Department of External Relations, National expert consultant
- November 1998 - January 1999, Washington DC USA, World Bank – Special Programs, Advisor to the Vice President. The Vice Presidency was established, inter alia, to encourage the reinforcement of partnerships with actors in civil society and to define new projects to promote culture and heritage.
- January 1998 - October 1998, Brussels Belgium, European Commission – Department of External Relations, Expert in charge of the direction of the project TEAM TACIS
- October 1994 - December 1997, Moscow Russia, Supporting Group for the G7, Deputy Director
- February 1993- September 1994, Washington DC USA, World Bank - Vice Presidency for Sustainable Development, Urban Development Division, Department of Transportation, Water and Urban Development, Senior Economist
- July 1988 - January 1993, Washington DC USA, World Bank - Vice Presidency of African, then Asian Regions, Division of Human Resources and Social Development, Economist to Senior Economist
- October 1980- June 1988, Paris France, Organisation for Economic Co-operation and Development, Administrator, Center for Development. Countries: Belgium, Brazil, Cambodia, Denmark, Egypt, France, Haiti, Hong Kong, Hungary, Indonesia, Ivory Coast, Jamaica, Kosovo (FRY), Malaysia, Mozambique, Nepal, Niger, Qatar, Russia, Senegal, Singapore, South Korea, Taiwan, Thailand, Togo, Tunisia, United States, Vietnam

== Publications ==
- Intégration des projets de gestion archéologique sous-marine dans le cadre d'un développement culturel de la ville d'Alexandrie (with Naguib Amin) in Actes des quatrièmes Rencontres Internationales du patrimoine de Monaco et de la Méditerranée, Monaco, summer 2008
- Bâtir les collections de l'avenir (with Ismail Serageldin), Art & Métiers du Livre, p. 20-31, Paris, n°261 August–September 2007
- Forging a Viable Peace : Developing a Legitimate Political Economy (with Stéphanie A. Blair, Dana Eyre, James Wasserstrom) in The Quest for Viable Peace, United States Institute of Peace, Washington, 2005
- Continuing Challenges: UNMIK's Report to Kosovo's donors on economic reconstruction, UNMIK, Pristina, 2001
- Sectoral and Project Performance Indicators in Bank-Financed Urban Development Operations, Urban Development Division, World Bank, Washington, 1996
- L'acquisition de compétences dans les micro-entreprises: données de terrain en Afrique de l’Ouest, OCED – World Bank – International Labour Organization, Paris, 1994
- La nouvelle approche du secteur informel (Editeur, avec David Turnham et Antoine Schwartz), OECD, Paris, 1990
- La lutte contre le chômage en milieu urbain dans les pays en développement (Editeur), OECD, Paris, 1989
- La Formation en cours d’emploi et le développement des ressources humaines: cinq expériences asiatiques (with Jacques Charmes), OCDE, Paris, 1988
- La formation en cours d'emploi (with Jacques Charmes), OECD, Paris, 1985
- Education et Développement: Le cas d'Haïti, OCDE, Paris, 1985
