= Innovative financing =

Innovative financing refers to a range of non-traditional mechanisms to raise funds for development aid through "innovative" projects such as micro-contributions, taxes, public-private partnerships and market-based financial transactions.

As of the beginning of 2010, most of the existing innovative financing mechanisms were allocated for the health care sector in developing countries. By 2010, Innovative financing mechanisms had raised US$2 billion for health care systems.

== Origin ==
The concept "innovative financing for development" was first mentioned and introduced at the International Conference on Financing for Development in 2002. The Conference led to what is now called the Monterrey Consensus where signatories acknowledged "…the value of exploring innovative sources of finance provided that those sources do not unduly burden developing countries." Innovative financing mechanisms were born out of a need to reach the Millennium Development Goals (MDGs) that 192 United Nations member states and at least 23 international organizations agreed to achieve by the year 2015. They include reducing extreme poverty, reducing child mortality rates, improving maternal health and combating HIV/AIDS, Malaria and other diseases such as Tuberculosis. So far, most donor states have failed to meet their 0.7% commitment from the Monterrey Consensus of their Gross National Income (GNI) dedicated to Official Development Assistance. Furthermore, in most developing countries the budget allocated for the social, and especially the Health sector, has been insufficient as it fails to meet the 15% Gross National Product (GNP) requirement dedicated to the Health Sector stated in the Abuja declaration of African leaders in 2001.

Innovative financing mechanisms emerged at the beginning of the twenty-first century as alternative mechanisms to help bridge the development financing gap.

== Principles of innovative financing mechanisms ==
Innovative financing mechanisms can be assessed regarding the following principles:

Scaling-up: Innovative financing mechanisms should significantly increase funding in order to bridge the financing gap necessary to achieve the MDGs.

Additionality: Since these mechanisms were created to fill this gap, innovative financing mechanisms cannot replace Official Development Assistance nor will they be sufficient if certain countries decide to renounce the commitments that they have made.

Complementarity: The role of innovative financing mechanisms is to raise new funds for existing organizations and not to add new actors and complexities to the development landscape.

Sustainability: In order to have a significant and sustainable impact on the MDG's, innovative financing mechanisms should have the objective and ability to finance long-term programs in coordination with other countries. Finally, innovative financing mechanisms should be designed to comply with the other principles of the 2005 Paris Declaration on Aid Effectiveness and the 2008 Accra Agenda for Action.

== Existing innovative financing mechanisms for Health ==
Unitaid, an international facility for the purchase of drugs against HIV/AIDS, Malaria and Tuberculosis, is supported by a so-called "air ticket solidarity levy," or a tax on airline tickets. As of 2009, 13 countries apply such a domestic tax on airline tickets. UNITAID funds projects through implementing partners across the three diseases based on the market impact criteria (making medication prices affordable for developing countries).

The International Finance Facility for Immunisation (IFFIm) issues bonds in the capital markets, converting long-term government pledges into immediately available cash resources. The pledges are used to repay IFFIm bondholders. So far, IFFIm has raised US$3.7 billion in the bonds markets backed by US$6.3 billion in government pledges. These funds are collected for the GAVI Alliance (formerly the Global Alliance for Vaccines and Immunisation). Since IFFIm's founding in 2006, it has provided close to half of GAVI's overall funding.

The Pneumococcal Advance Market Commitment (AMC) is a mechanism that supports the work of the GAVI Alliance by providing a financial incentive to manufacturers to invest in R&D and expand manufacturing capacity for new vaccines. Governments or organizations commit to buy or subsidize the purchase of a certain number of vaccines at a given price. The AMC has been implemented for pneumococcal vaccines to demonstrate both the feasibility of the AMC mechanism and its impact on accelerating the introduction and mass-production of these vaccines. As of summer 2012, the AMC had supported the introduction of pneumococcal vaccine in 17 developing countries.

Product RED is a mechanism supporting The Global Fund to Fight AIDS, Tuberculosis and Malaria. Thanks to the mechanism, global companies contribute a share of their profits on goods from sales branded with the Product Red trademark.

Debt2Health is a mechanism supporting the Global Fund to fight HIV/AIDS, Tuberculosis and Malaria. Through this mechanism, the Global Fund facilitates debt negotiation between creditors and debtors. Creditors agree to forgo part of the repayment of the money due to them against the commitment of the debtor to invest an agreed-upon amount on Global Fund-approved programs. So far, €200 million has been pledged by the end of 2009 and €50 million had been disbursed in October 2008.

Voluntary Contributions on travel and tourism products funds are collected by the Millennium Foundation through a donation to MASSIVEGOOD which lets travellers make an optional $2, £2 or €2 "micro-contribution" every time they purchase a travel services. All funds go to UNITAID in its fight against HIV/AIDS, tuberculosis and malaria. Additional funding will go towards improving maternal and child health in the developing world.

De-Tax is a "proposal to earmark a share of VAT Taxes generated by participating businesses for health systems development". De-Tax is being discussed by the G20 countries.

== Possible innovative financing mechanisms ==
Among some potential future innovative finance mechanisms:

Currency Transaction Levy (CTL) is a potential mechanism that would let governments apply a tax on foreign exchange transactions. An expert working group is underway to assess the feasibility of the proposed levy of 0.005%. The tax would be managed through computerized payments made in connection with the settlement of every trade. Auctioning of permits to emit greenhouse gases could be one of the first innovative financing mechanisms earmarked for environmental purposes. Germany announced that it would allocate €225 million from the 2009 proceeds of these auctions to fund development activities.

The development process of new innovative financing mechanisms has been improved thanks to the contribution of various players. Interagency initiatives such as The High Level Taskforce on Innovative International Financing for Health Systems and The Leading Group on Innovative Financing for Development have facilitated coordination processes between actors and is also a platform for introducing new innovative financing mechanisms.

LSL World Initiative is another company focusing on innovative financing. They assist governments to put in place micro-surcharges, taxes and public-private partnerships as mechanisms to raise additional funds and finance development projects. They focus specifically on the Information and communications technology (ICT) and telecoms sector, harnessing diaspora flows.

Another example of innovative (ocean) financing ″is the issuing of Blue Bonds by the Government of the Seychelles, an innovative approach to promote the African islands’ blue economy investment strategy.″ The intention of the bond is to finance and enhance the local fishery management in order to secure the marine ecosystem.

Key publications have helped shaping the Innovative Financing framework. Among these key publications are: the Landau report, the report of Working Group 2 from the Task Force for Innovative Financing in Health Systems, a report by Brookings Institution and the World Bank.

Innovative Financing has received support from the United Nations through international conferences on Financing for Development and the Doha Declaration on Financing for Development.
