= Elimination of tuberculosis =

Global health initiative

Elimination of tuberculosis is the effort to reduce the number of tuberculosis (TB) cases to less than one per 1 million population, contrasted with the effort to completely eradicate infection in humans worldwide. The goal of tuberculosis elimination is hampered by the lack of rapid testing, short and effective treatment courses, and completely effective vaccine. The WHO as well as the Stop TB Partnership aim for the full elimination of TB by 2050—requiring a 1000-fold reduction in tuberculosis incidence. As of 2017, tuberculosis has not been eliminated from any country.

== Feasibility ==
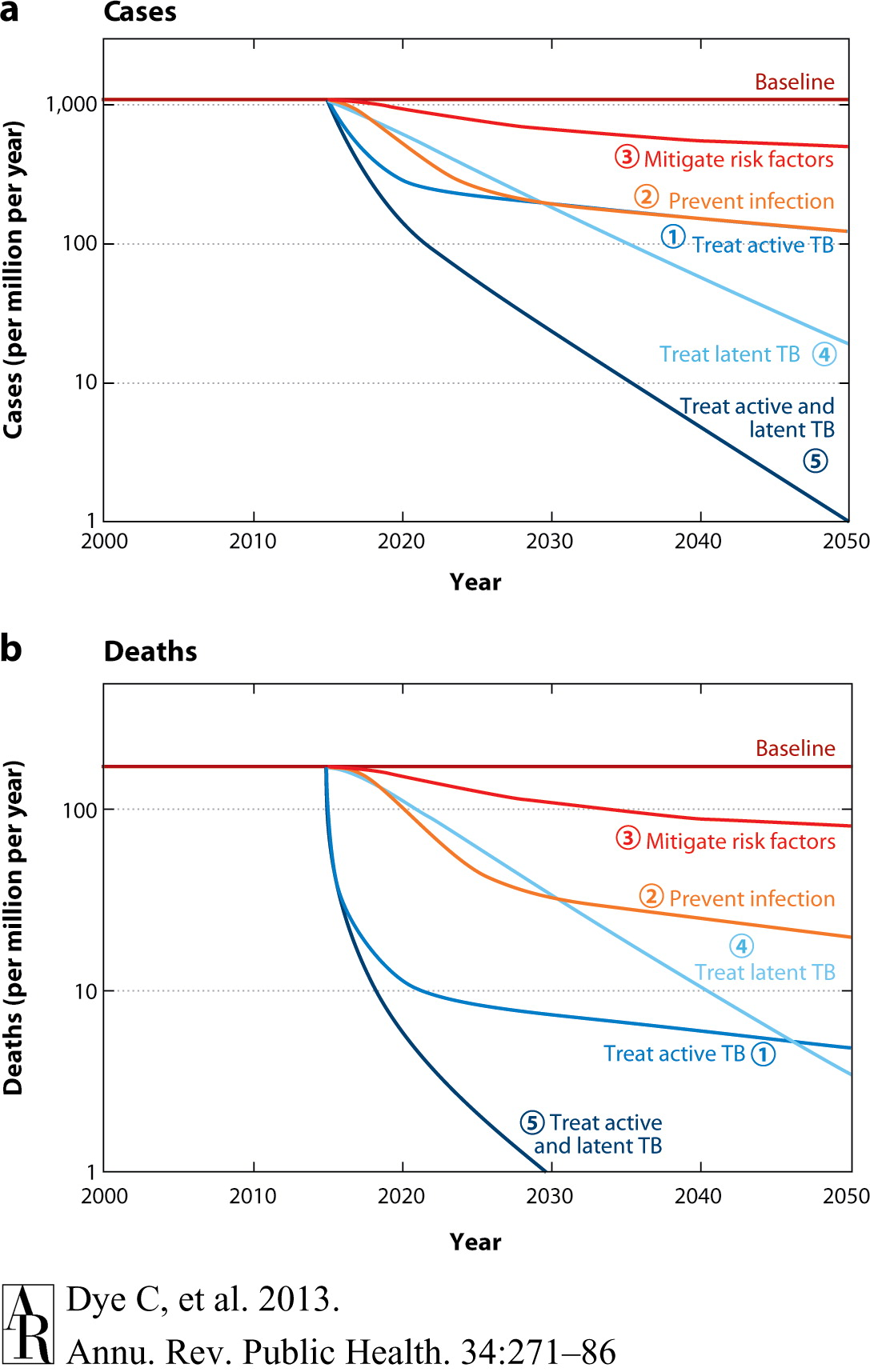
Prospects for tuberculosis control and elimination in a hypothetical high-burden country, starting in 2015

Tuberculosis has been a curable illness since the 1940s when the first drugs became available, although multidrug-resistant and extensively drug-resistant TB present an increasing challenge. According to a 2017 article in International Journal of Infectious Diseases, tuberculosis eradication is possible if enough technology, funding, and political will were available, but the characteristics of the disease do not make it easy to eradicate. So far, tuberculosis has not been eliminated from any country. According to European Respiratory Review, tuberculosis eradication is not considered possible due to the lack of a completely effective vaccine and large reservoir of people infected with latent tuberculosis.

According to a 2013 review, tuberculosis elimination will require not just treating active tuberculosis but also latent cases, and eliminating tuberculosis by 2050 worldwide is not possible, although great reductions in infections and deaths are possible. Addressing poverty is a further requirement for eliminating tuberculosis. People who are poor are disproportionately affected by tuberculosis because the disease is made worse by inadequate housing and malnutrition, and poverty can make it difficult to get treatment. The WHO has estimated that eliminating poverty would reduce tuberculosis incidence by 84 percent.

== Elimination strategies ==
=== Globally ===
In 2014, the World Health Organization launched the End TB Strategy with the goal of reducing tuberculosis deaths by 95% and incidence by 90% before 2035. As of 2020, the world was not on track to meet those goals. The WHO, as well as the Stop TB Partnership, are now aiming for the full elimination of TB by the year 2050, which will require a 1000-fold reduction in the incidence of the disease.

=== India ===
In 2017, the Indian government announced its intention to eliminate tuberculosis in the country by 2025. The previous year, it accounted for 27 percent of tuberculosis cases and 29 percent of deaths worldwide, making it the highest burden country for both tuberculosis and multidrug-resistant tuberculosis.
