= Truenat =

Truenat is a chip-based, point-of-care, rapid molecular test for diagnosis of infectious diseases. The technology is based on the Taqman RTPCR (Real Time Reverse Transcription Polymerase Chain Reaction) chemistry which can be performed on the portable, battery operated Truelab Real Time micro PCR platform. Truenat is developed and manufactured by Goa-based Molbio Diagnostics Private Limited.

== Truenat for TB ==
Based on findings from a multi-centre diagnostic accuracy assessment conducted by The Foundation for Innovative New Diagnostics (FIND), the World Health Organization (WHO) announced endorsement of Molbio's molecular assays Truenat MTB, Truenat MTB Plus and Truenat MTB RIFDx as initial diagnostic tests of pulmonary Tuberculosis and Rifampicin Resistance through a rapid communication in January,2020. The Truenat test was incorporated in India's National Tuberculosis Elimination Programme after recommendations from the Indian Council of Medical Research (ICMR).

The Government of Andhra Pradesh was one of the first adopter of Truenat under its Revised National Tuberculosis Control Programme (RNTCP) for TB diagnosis. In October 2018, the state rolled out Truenat in Designated Microscopy Centres (DMC) across 13 districts. Truenat was found to improved TB case notification rates by 30% in Andhra Pradesh

== Truenat for COVID-19 ==
In April, 2020 the point-of-care Truenat test for diagnosis of COVID-19 was launched after validation at the State Level Virus Research and Diagnostic Laboratory, Bangalore Medical College and Research Institute and subsequent approval from the Indian Council of Medical Research (ICMR). The test processes oropharyngeal and nasopharyngeal swab specimen and provides results within one hour from sample collection.

Samples are collected in a viral lysis buffer that require very minimal biosafety and biosecurity. The Lancet remarked, "This innovative technology-driven COVID-19 testing platform has been a game changer for testing in underserved areas and quick testing in emergency departments of health-care facilities in India."

== Technology ==
The Truenat test is run on the battery-powered Truelab system. This system consists of a sample preparation device ( this device is used for RNA/DNA extraction and then the purification from the sample) and along with that - the PCR analyzer device. This device is available in 1-, 2-, or 4-module configurations. The lattermost configuration is capable of testing four samples at the same time.

The devices function in a wide range of environmental conditions with minimal user input, making them suitable for use in primary healthcare settings with minimal infrastructural requirements, providing an automated reporting system and having real time data transfer capability for centralized monitoring and analytics for disease surveillance.
