= ECompliance =

Biometrics based Android application

eCompliance is a biometrics based Android application loaded onto an Android tablet which is connected to a fingerprint reader and/or iris scanner. It was developed by Microsoft Research for the use of Operation ASHA – an NGO dedicated to healthcare treatment, especially tuberculosis . It is used to ensure adherence to various protocols and for ensuring accurate measurements and transparency of operations. It is being used to provide adherence to the Directly Observed Therapy, Short-Course (DOTS) protocol of TB treatment in India and Cambodia. It has also been used by Operation ASHA to ensure patient adherence of hemophilia treatment protocol.

eCompliance has been replicated by third parties in various countries, including Uganda, Kenya, Peru, the Dominican Republic, Afghanistan, and Tanzania. It has been rolled out for nearly 28,000 TB and hemophilia patients. The system has recorded over one million transactions. The tablet on which eCompliance is used on is connected to a central server through internet and updates that server whenever synced, allowing data to be easily accessed from a central server. It can hence work offline as well.

== Description ==
For TB treatment, patients are enrolled into eCompliance by scanning their fingerprints at the time of registration into Operation ASHA’s program. Basic demographic data, like address and phone number, are recorded into the system along with the schedule of the patient for coming into Operation ASHA’s centers to take their medication. When the patients go to the treatment center to take their medication, their fingerprint is scanned along with the fingerprint of the health worker present. Only then is the medicine given to the patient to swallow. The simultaneous scanning of both fingerprints is proof that the medicine was given under direct supervision, which is required by the DOTS protocol of TB treatment that Operation ASHA follows. If a patient fails to show up, the health worker gets a text message from the eCompliance system. The health worker then goes to the patient's house to give them the medication and scan their fingerprint as proof of medication intake. Thus, eCompliance has decreased the number of missed doses drastically and the default rate (i.e. the rate at which patients drop out of the treatment program) also reduces by a huge margin.

== Research ==
In western Uganda, research was carried out to determine the efficacy and impact of eCompliance in TB treatment of patients . Through direct observation of 142 patients, DOTS outcomes of patients in the eCompliance intervention group were compared to patients in two control groups. It was found that the intervention patients had a higher cure rate than all other patients (55% versus 28.3%). The intervention group had a default rate to follow up rate lower than all other groups (0% versus 7%). Also, the intervention group had significantly lower odds of having a negative DOTS outcome (0% versus 17%).

The perceived impact of eCompliance was evaluated by interviews with 8 health workers, 4 center owners, and 23 patients . It was found that eCompliance helps draw patients to treatment centers by incentivizing health workers to convince patients to come, and by persuading patients that in-person visits are important. Professor Yanis Ben Amor describes the system as "a staggering improvement".
