= Unitaid =

Global health initiative

- Founded: 2006; 20 years ago
- Founders: France, Brazil, Chile, Norway and the United Kingdom
- Purpose: HIV/AIDS, Malaria, Tuberculosis
- Location: Geneva, Switzerland
- Region served: Worldwide
- Method: Grants
- Key people: Executive Director, Dr. Philippe Duneton; Marisol Touraine, Chair of Unitaid Executive Board
- Revenue: Over US$ 3 billion in contributions from donors between 2006 and 2019, 63% of which has been raised through a solidarity levy on airline tickets
- Website: unitaid.org

Unitaid is a global health initiative that works with partners to bring about innovations to prevent, diagnose and treat major diseases in low- and middle-income countries, with an emphasis on tuberculosis, malaria, and HIV/AIDS and its deadly co-infections. Founded in 2006, the organization funds the final stages of research and development of new drugs, diagnostics and disease-prevention tools, helps produce data supporting guidelines for their use, and works to allow more affordable generic medicines to enter the marketplace in low- and middle-income countries. Hosted by the World Health Organization (WHO) in Geneva, Unitaid was established by the governments of Brazil, Chile, France, Norway and the United Kingdom.

As of 2019, Unitaid manages a portfolio of 48 grants worth around US$1.3 billion. More than half of Unitaid's projects contribute to the global fight against antimicrobial resistance.

Unitaid supports programs that are implemented by organizations such as Coalition Plus, the Clinton Health Access Initiative, Elizabeth Glaser Pediatric AIDS Foundation, Expertise France, The Global Fund, Foundation for Innovative New Diagnostics, Médecins Sans Frontières, Medicines for Malaria Venture, Stop TB Partnership, TB Alliance, UNICEF and others.

== Areas of work ==
- Unitaid and partners have brought new, affordable HIV medicines to people in Africa in three years, three times faster than for previous generations of antiretrovirals. Further reductions in prices are expected to save the global health response US$300 million each year.
- Unitaid and partners have revolutionized childhood TB treatment with quality paediatric medicines that are affordable and taste good. Unitaid is also investing in better approaches to help find the one million children affected by TB each year, and to identify drug-resistant strains of TB in patients with genome-based diagnostic technologies.
- The Unitaid-supported ACCESS-SMC pilot project (2014–2018) demonstrated that providing small children with oral medication during the rainy season in Africa's Sahel region protects against malaria, and that the strategy is feasible and cost effective. As the result of the project, 12 countries were delivering seasonal malaria chemoprevention as of mid-2019.
- Unitaid and its partners are finding new ways to manage and mitigate mosquitoes' resistance to insecticide with the first long-lasting insecticides recommended by WHO in 40 years, new bed nets, anti-parasitic drugs, and treated plastic sheets that drive mosquitoes away from where people live.
- Unitaid and partners have succeeded in introducing quality-assured, affordable self-testing kits across Africa in the space of three years. Fifty-nine countries now have policies on HIV self-testing.
- In 2010, Unitaid created and invested in the Medicines Patent Pool (MPP) to negotiate voluntary licenses for HIV medicines. MPP's work helped bring about the widespread use of tenofovir for HIV treatment, which resulted in a savings of $195 million in drug costs between 2012 and 2015.

== Financing ==
Unitaid's main donors are France, the United Kingdom, Norway, the Bill & Melinda Gates Foundation, Brazil, Spain, the Republic of Korea, and Chile.

The single main source of income is an airline ticket tax currently in effect in ten countries: Cameroon, Chile, Congo, France, Guinea, Madagascar, Mali, Mauritius, Niger and the Republic of Korea. In France, a tax of €2.63 to €63.07 (2020) is added to the price of each airline ticket. The higher fees are for first- or business-class passengers traveling to destinations outside Europe. In January 2013, France's Directorate General for Civil Aviation announced that the French air ticket tax had collected 1 billion euros since its inception.

Norway allocates part of its tax on carbon dioxide emissions from aviation to Unitaid, and the United Kingdom contributes through multi-year commitments.

== History ==
In early 2006, France's President Jacques Chirac announced his decision to create a drug-purchase facility to advance international development projects, with France contributing 90 percent of its new airline ticket tax toward the endeavor. The idea of creating an airline ticket tax to finance development goals was first proposed, under French President Jacques Chirac's initiative, by the Landau report written by Jean-Pierre Landau, Bertrand Badré, Gilles Mentré and Corso Bavagnoli. Chile joined the effort, establishing its own airline ticket tax to support international development. That September, Unitaid was founded by Brazil, Chile, France, Norway and the United Kingdom despite IATA's opposition to the "Chirac tax"

== Structure ==
The executive board, Unitaid's decision-making body, determines the organization's objectives, monitors progress and approves budgets. Representation on the 12-member Board includes Brazil, Chile, Norway, France, Spain and the United Kingdom, one member from Africa chosen by the African Union, one from Asia, two from civil society, one from the constituency of foundations, and one from the World Health Organization.

== See also ==
- The Global Fund
- WHO
- UNICEF
- Clinton Foundation
- Stop TB Partnership
- Médecins Sans Frontières
- UNAIDS
- The Millennium Foundation
- MassiveGood
- Foundation for Innovative New Diagnostics
- Medicines Patent Pool
