= Nikshay Poshan Yojana =

Indian government scheme

Nikshay Poshan Yojana is a government scheme in India to provide 500 rupees per month (1000 rupees per month since November 2024) for tuberculosis patients to buy food.

By February 2019 the programme reported that more than 10,000 people had received benefits in Delhi and 3800 were taking benefit in Sonitpur district.

== Responses ==
Since 2018 the patient advocacy group Survivors Against TB have publicly requested that the government increase the benefits of the programme and to make enrollment more routine for more patients.

A 2018 evaluation of the participant registry found problematic data, including an inability to do data deduplication in the system.

In 2018 in Assam fewer than expected people had been enrolling in the programme.

== Research ==
2018 studies in Delhi and Vadodara examined patient participation in the programme. Both studies found that about half the eligible participants received payment. Payment came for many people five months after the start of treatment. Major barriers to getting payment included lack of bank accounts among patients and difficulty completing the registration to join the program.

== Further consideration ==
- Singh, Jyotsna (24 March 2020). "No Food on Plate for TB Patients Due to Non-implementation of Govt Aid". NewsClick.
- "Nikshay Poshan Yojana - Incentives for nutritional support to TB patients". YouTube (in Hindi). Survivors Against TB. 29 October 2018.
