= Joseph William Bhore =

Indian civil servant and diwan of the Cochin State

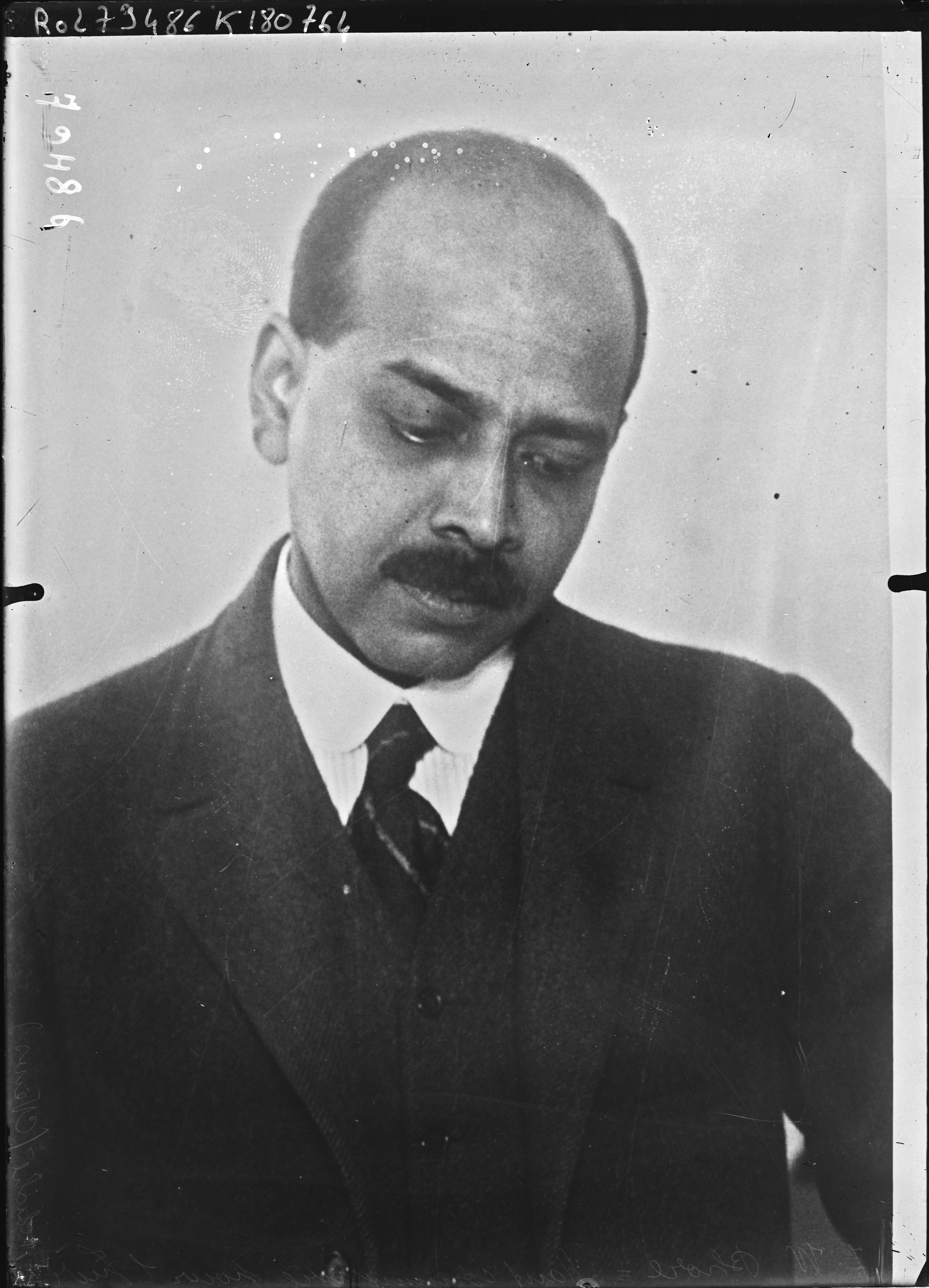
In 1922

Sir Joseph William Bhore KCSI KCIE CBE (1878 – 15 August 1960) was an Indian civil servant and diwan of the Cochin State. He is best remembered for his chairmanship of the Health Survey and Development Committee (Bhore Committee) that charted a course for public health investments and infrastructure in India.

== Early life and education ==
J. W. Bhore was born in Nasik in 1878 as the son of Rao Saheb R. G. Bhore and was educated at Bishop's High School and Deccan College in Pune and University College, London.

== ICS Officer ==
Bhore joined the Indian Civil Service in 1902 and was assigned the Madras ICS cadre and held a number of senior government offices in Madras and Cochin.

Bhore worked variously in the Departments of Agriculture and Lands (1924–28), Industries and Labour (1930–32) and Commerce and Railways (1932–35) during his career as a civil servant.

He was the Acting High Commissioner for India in the UK during 1922–1923 and a Member of the Governor General's Executive Council during 1926–1927 and 1930–1932. He represented India at the Silver Jubilee Celebrations in London in 1935. He was also Secretary to the Indian Statutory Commission – better known as the Simon Commission - established in 1928 to report on the working of representative institutions in British India and the Government of India Act 1919.

== Honours ==
Bhore was appointed a Commander of the Order of the British Empire (CBE) in the 1920 New Year Honours, and appointed a Companion of the Order of the Indian Empire (CIE) in the 1923 King's Birthday Honours. He was promoted to a Knight Commander of the Order of the Indian Empire (KCIE) in the 1930 King's Birthday Honours, and appointed a Knight Commander of the Order of the Star of India (KCSI) in the 1933 New Year Honours.

== Diwan of Cochin ==
J. W. Bhore had been Under Secretary, Government of Madras when he was appointed by the Raja of Cochin as Dewan in 1914, succeeding A. R. Banerji. During his five years in Cochin from 1914 to 1919, Bhore paid attention to agrarian reforms in the state. The Tenancy Regulation of 1914 and the establishment of panchayats and co-operative societies in Cochin were among his major achievements.

== Bhore Committee ==
Bhore is perhaps best remembered for his chairmanship of the Health Survey and Development Committee which was established in 1943 by the British colonial government. The committee was tasked with undertaking ‘a broad survey of the present position in regard to health conditions and health organisation in British India’ and with making ‘recommendations for future developments’ in this regard.

In its final report in 1946, the Committee noted thus: "If it were possible to evaluate the loss, which this country annually suffers through the avoidable waste of valuable human material and the lowering of human efficiency through malnutrition and preventable morbidity, we feel that the result would be so startling that the whole country would be aroused and would not rest until a radical change had been brought about".

Two particular recommendations of the committee dealt with the establishment of Primary Health Centres and the creation of a major central institute for postgraduate medical education and research. In pursuit of these recommendations, the Government of India established the first Primary Health Centres in 1952 and in 1956, it set up the All-India Institute of Medical Sciences (AIIMS). The decision to abolish the Licentiate in Medical Practice (LMP) and to replace it with single medical qualification of an MBBS degree as the requirement to become a doctor was also taken up in 1952 on the basis of the committee's recommendation.

The Bhore Committee provided the outline for setting up an organised public health system in India and it was deeply inspired by the welfare state movement in the U.K. and socialist developments in the USSR. The Committee however has been criticised for overlooking the role of indigenous practitioners of medicine in the health system leading to a large number of private practitioners, who formed the mainstay of health care in rural areas and small towns, being ignored by the new system.

== Death ==
Bhore married Scottish physician and medical missionary Margaret Bhore MBE (née Stott) in 1911. She died in Bhopal in May 1945. Bhore died in Guernsey, Channel Islands on 15 August 1960.
