= Bhore Committee =

Indian government committee on healthcare

The Bhore Committee was set up by the Government of India in 1943. Also known as the health survey and development committee. It was a health survey taken by a development committee to assess health condition of India. The development committee worked under Joseph William Bhore, who acted as the chairman of committee. The committee consisted of pioneers in the healthcare field who met frequently for two years and submitted their report in 1946.

== Aim ==
The major aim of the committee was to survey then existing position regarding the health conditions and health organisation in the country and to make recommendations for future development, in order to improve the public health system in India.

== Recommendations ==
The Report was printed in four volumes. It laid out the proposal for a national program of health services in India and also stressed the importance of preventive care in Subject to curative treatment.

It said, "If it was possible to the evaluate the loss, which this country annually suffers through the avoidable waste of valuable human material and the lowering of human efficiency through malnutrition and preventable morbidity, we feel that the result would be so startling that the whole country would be aroused and would not rest until a radical change had been brought about."

Some of the important recommendations of the Bhore Committee were:

1. Integration of preventive and curative services at all administrative levels.
2. Development of Primary Health Centres (PHC) in 2 stages:
  1. Short-term measure – one Primary Health Centre was suggested for a population of 40,000. Each PHC was to be staffed by 2 doctors, one nurse, four public health nurses, four midwives, four trained dais, two sanitary inspectors, two health assistants, one pharmacist and fifteen other class IV employees. The first was established in 1952. Secondary health centres were also envisaged to provide support to PHCs, and to coordinate and supervise their functioning
  2. A long-term programme (also called the 3 million plan) of setting up primary health units with 75 – bedded hospitals for each 10,000 to 20,000 population and secondary units with 650 – bedded hospital, again regionalised around district hospitals with 2500 beds.
3. Major changes in medical education which included 3 months training in preventive and social medicine to prepare "social physicians".
4. Abolition of the Licentiate in Medical Practice (etc) qualifications and their replacement by a single national standard Bachelor of Medicine and Bachelor of Surgery (MB BS) degree.
5. Creation of a major central institute for post-graduate medical education and research: which was achieved in 1956 with the All-India Institute of Medical Sciences (AIIMS).

== Implementation ==
The proposals of the committee were accepted in 1952 by the government of newly independent India. Though most of the recommendations of the committee were not implemented at the time, the committee was a trigger to the reforms that followed.

== Outcomes ==
The committee was instrumental in bringing about the public health reforms related to peripheral health centres in India. Primary Health Centres were built across the nation to provide integrated promotive, preventive, curative and rehabilitative services to entire urban as well as rural population, as an integral component of wider community development programme.
