= Public health system in India =

Indian Healthcare

The public healthcare system in India has evolved due to a number of influences since 1947, including British influence from the colonial period. The need for an efficient and effective public health system in India is large.

Public health system across nations is a conglomeration of all organized activities that prevent disease, prolong life and promote health and efficiency of its people. The Indian healthcare system has been historically dominated by provision of medical care and neglected public health. 11.9% of all maternal deaths and 18% of all infant mortality in the world occurs in India, ranking it the highest in the world in 2021. 36.6 out of 1000 children are dead by the time they reach the age of 5. 62% of children are immunized. Communicable disease is the cause of death for 53% of all deaths in India.

Public health initiatives that affect people in all states, such as the National Health Mission, Ayushman Bharat, National Mental Health Program, are instilled by the Union Ministry of Health and Family Welfare. There are multiple systems set up in rural and urban areas of India including Primary Health Centres, Community Health Centres, Sub Centres, and Government Hospitals. These programmes must follow the standards set by Indian Public Health Standards documents that are revised when needed.

== History ==
Public health systems in the colonial period were focused on health care for British citizens who were living in India. The period saw research institutes, public health legislation, and sanitation departments, although only 3% of Indian households had toilets at this time. Annual health reports were released and the prevention of contagious disease outbreaks was stressed. At the end of the colonial period, death rates from infectious diseases such as cholera had fallen to a low, although other diseases were still rampant.

In modern-day India, the spread of communicable diseases is under better control and now non-communicable diseases, Non-communicable diseases, such as cardiovascular conditions, are now the leading causes of death, are major killers. Health care reform was prioritized in the 1946 Bhore Committee Report which suggested the implementation of a health care system that was financed at least in part by the Indian government. In 1983 the first National Health Policy (NHP) of India was created with the goals of establishing a system with primary-care facilities and a referral system. In 2002, the updated NHP focused on improving the practicality and reach of the system as well as incorporating private and public clinics into the health sphere. In the context of universal health coverage, the recent policy focus in India, there is an attempt to ensure that every citizen should have adequate access to curative care without any financial hardships. Equally relevant is the acknowledgement of social determinants of health as an important determinant of population health and the need to have a public health cadre within the existing health care system. This highlights the need to distinguish between 'Public health' system and 'Public' sector health care system as the latter uses public to indicate the primary role of government and not necessarily as population as used in public health. Public health funding primarily benefits the middle and upper classes, leading to unequal access, as it targets creating more health professional jobs, expanding research institutions, and improving training. This creates unequal access to health care for the lower classes who do not receive the benefits of this funding. Today, states pay for about 75% of the public healthcare system but insufficient state spending neglects the public health system in India. This results in the Out-of-pocket health expenditure by households comprising 60.6% of the total health expenditure of India.

== Facilities ==
The healthcare system is organised into primary, secondary, and tertiary levels. At the primary level are Sub Centres and Primary Health Centres (PHCs). At the secondary level there are Community Health Centres (CHCs) and smaller Sub-District hospitals. Finally, the top level of public care provided by the government is the tertiary level, which consists of Medical Colleges and District/General Hospitals. The number of PHCs, CHCs, Sub Centres, and District Hospitals has increased in the past six years, although not all of them are up to the standards set by Indian Public Health Standards.

=== Sub Centres ===
A Sub Centre is designed to serve extremely rural areas with the expenses fully covered by the national government. Mandates require health staff to be at least two workers (male and female) to serve a population of 5000 people (or 3000 in a remote or hilly areas). Sub Centres also work to educate rural people about healthy habits for a more long-term impact.

=== Primary Health Centres ===
Primary Health Centres exist in more developed rural areas of 30,000 or more (20,000 in remote areas) and serve as larger health clinics staffed with doctors and paramedics. Patients can be referred from local sub centres to PHCs for more complex cases. A major difference from Sub Centres is that state governments fund PHCs, not the national government. PHCs also function to improve health education with a larger emphasis on preventative measures.

=== Community Health Centres ===
A Community Health Centre is also funded by state governments and accepts patients referred from Primary Health Centres. It serves 120,000 people in urban areas or 80,000 people in remote areas. Patients from these agencies can be transferred to general hospitals for further treatments. Thus, CHC's are also first referral units, or FRUs, which are required to have obstetric care, new born/childcare, and blood storage capacities at all hours everyday of the week.

=== Sub-District Hospitals/Taluk Hospitals ===
Sub District/Sub Divisional/Taluk Hospitals are located in sub-district headquarters and provide more specialized medical services than community health centers. Taluk hospitals are located in taluk headquarters and provide more specialized medical services than community health centers.Taluk Hospital is a secondary healthcare center located in the administrative headquarters of a taluk (Tehsil). Taluk hospitals provide basic medical services to the people of the local community. They have departments for general medicine, pediatrics, obstetrics and gynecology, dermatology, ophthalmology, dentistry, and psychiatry. Taluk hospitals also have a laboratory and a pharmacy that provide diagnostic and treatment services to patients. The hospital has an emergency department that operates 24 hours a day, providing immediate medical attention to patients who require urgent medical care. Taluk Hospitals are set up either by upgrading the existing Community Health Centre (CHCs). They are referred to as Sub-district (sub-divisional) hospital for the purpose of standardisation under the revised guidelines of Indian Public Health Standards (IPHS). Taluk Hospitals are below the district and above the block level CHCs. Taluk Hospital serves as a vital connection between the SC (Sub-Centre), PHC (Public Health Centre), CHC (Community Health Centre), and District Hospital on one end. It reduces the workload at the district hospital and cuts travel time for patients in need of emergency care. Sub District hospitals are below the district and above the block level (CHC) hospitals and act as Referral Units for the Tehsil/Taluk/Block population in which they are geographically located.

=== District Hospitals ===
District Hospitals are the tertiary referral centers for the primary and secondary levels of the public health system. It is expected that at least one hospital is in each district of India, As of 2010, there were only 605 district hospitals, despite the existence of 640 districts. There are normally anywhere between 75 and 500 beds, depending on population demand. These district hospitals often lack modern equipment and relations with local blood banks.

=== General Hospitals ===
Government General Hospitals are major public healthcare institutions administered by the respective state governments in India. In Kerala, these hospitals are usually located in district headquarters or major urban centres and provide secondary and tertiary medical care. They offer a range of services including emergency care, outpatient and inpatient treatment, specialist consultations, and diagnostic facilities. These hospitals often act as referral centres for Primary Health Centres (PHCs) and Community Health Centres (CHCs) within the district. Treatment is generally provided free of cost or at subsidised rates, making them a critical component of the public health system.

=== Medical Colleges and Research Institutions ===
All India Institutes of Medical Sciences is owned and controlled by the central government. These are referral hospitals with specialized facilities. All India Institutes presently functional are AIIMS New Delhi, Bhopal, AIIMS Bhubaneshwar, AIIMS Jodhpur, AIIMS Raipur, AIIMS Patna and AIIMS Rishiksh. A Regional Cancer Centre is a cancer care hospital and research institute controlled jointly by the central and the respective state governments. Government Medical Colleges are owned and controlled by the respective state governments and also function as referral hospitals.

== Government Public Health initiatives ==
In 2018, Ayushman Bharat, a flagship scheme of the Government of India, was launched by the Prime Minister of India as recommended by the National Health Policy 2017 to achieve the vision of Universal Health Coverage (UHC). It includes two interrelated components: Health and Wellness Centres (HWCs) and Pradhan Mantri Jan Arogya Yojana (PM-JAY).

In 2006, the Public Health Foundation of India was started by the Prime Minister of India as both a private and public initiative. The goal of this organisation is to incorporate more public health policies and diverse professionals into web the healthcare sphere. It also collaborates with international public health organisations to gather more knowledge and direct discussions around needs and improvements to the current system. Oftentimes officials in policy making positions have a gap in their education about public health, and MPH and PhD programs in public health are lacking in their number of students and resources. The Public Health Foundation aims to further these programs and educate more people in this field. The research discovered would be made transparent to the Indian public at large, so that the entire nation is aware of health standards in the country.

=== Community Health Workers ===
The Indian government first began to implement community health worker programs in 1977. Community health workers provide advice and support to other women in their community. Sometimes referred to as sakhis, these women capitalize on their familiarity with the community to gain credibility and promote public health measures, usually by leading participatory groups. Community health workers also function to mediate between modern allopathic medicine and traditional indigenous forms of healing, such as by tailoring allopathic health recommendations to include and legitimize traditional beliefs. Community health workers closely cooperate with each other and with other types of health workers (such as auxiliary nurse midwives) to encourage care utilization and deliver health services. Currently, India's largest community health worker program, started in 2005 and now subsumed in the National Health Mission, consists of nearly one million Accredited Social Health Activist, a ratio of one for every 1000 people in rural villages and marginalized urban communities.

Community health workers and participatory groups have been shown to change health behaviors and impact health outcomes such as neonatal mortality. Factors for these positive changes include active inclusion and recruitment of a large portion of women in the community, engagement and participation during skill development, and involvement of the community beyond group participation. Community health workers may also serve as community leaders and change-makers by empowering women and demanding policy action to address health inequities. Addressing these social determinants of health has a direct impact on healthcare utilization. For example, empowered women are less likely to face health problems because they are more likely to be aware of problems with their health and therefore more likely to seek care to address these problems.

This grassroots intervention strategy often involves partnerships with local hospitals or government-organized non-governmental organizations (GONGOs), who train female volunteers from the community and help organize participatory groups. Though demonstrated to be effective, community health worker programs can be hampered by a lack of monitoring and accountability as a result of governmental decentralization. Community health workers are not government employees but rather volunteers that state governments are responsible for training and financially incentivizing. Health workers may also lack a sufficient understanding of the public health measure they are trying to promote due to inadequate training and resources.

== Drawbacks ==
Drawbacks to India's healthcare system today include low quality care, corruption, unhappiness with the system, a lack of accountability, unethical care, overcrowding of clinics, poor cooperation between public and private spheres, barriers of access to services and medicines, lack of public health knowledge, and low cost factor. These drawbacks push wealthier Indians to use the private healthcare system, which is less accessible to low-income families, creating unequal medical treatment between classes. Doctors are reluctant to practice in rural areas.

=== Low quality care ===
Low quality care is prevalent due to misdiagnosis, under trained health professionals, and the prescription of incorrect medicines. A study discovered a doctor in a PHC in Delhi who prescribed the wrong treatment method 50% of the time. Indians in rural areas where this problem is rampant are prevented from improving their health situation. Enforcement and revision of the regulations set by the Union Ministry of Health and Family Welfare IPHS is also not strict. The 12th Five-Year Plan (India) dictates a need to improve enforcement and institutionalize treatment methods across all clinics in the nation in order to increase the quality of care. There is also a lack of accountability across both private and public clinics in India, although public doctors feel less responsibility to treat their patients effectively than do doctors in private clinics. Impolite interactions from the clinic staff may lead to less effective procedures.

=== Corruption ===
Healthcare professionals take more time off from work than the amount they are allotted with the majority of absences being for no official reason. India's public healthcare system pays salaries during absences, leading to excessive personal days being paid for by the government. This phenomenon is especially heightened in Sub Centres and PHCs and results in expenditure that isn't correlated to better work performance.

=== Overcrowding of clinics ===
Clinics are overcrowded and understaffed without enough beds to support their patients. Statistics show that the number of health professionals in India is less than the average number for other developing nations. In rural Bihar the number of doctors is 0.3 for every 10,000 individuals. Urban hospitals have twice the number of beds than rural hospitals do but the number is still insufficient to provide for the large number of patients that visit. Sometimes patients are referred from rural areas to larger hospitals, increasing the overcrowding in urban cities.

Overcrowding also increases the likelihood of diseases spreading, particularly in urban, crowded areas of cities. Improper sanitation and waste disposal, even within clinics, can lead to an increased incidence of infectious diseases.

=== Poor cooperation between public and private spheres ===
5% of visits to health practitioners are in private clinics or hospitals, many of which are paid for out of pocket. Money is spent on improving private services instead of on funding the public sector. Lack of effective public-private healthcare partnerships often leads to financial agreements that do not prioritize equitable access for all citizens.These contracts would allow the private sector to finance projects to improve knowledge and facilities in the public sphere.

=== Barriers of access ===
Both social and financial inequality results in barriers of access to healthcare services in India. Services aren't accessible for the disabled, mentally challenged, and elderly populations. Mothers are disadvantaged and in many rural areas there is a lack of abortion services and contraception methods. Public clinics often have a shortage of the appropriate medicines or may supply them at excessively high prices, resulting in large out of pocket costs (even for those with insurance coverage). Large distances prevent Indians from getting care, and if families travel far distance there is low assurance that they will receive proper medical attention at that particular time.

=== Hospital fires ===
Many government hospitals do not follow the fire safety norms set in the National Building Code of India owing to cost saving measures and the preference for the lowest bidder in construction projects. Due to this there have been frequent news reports of major hospital fires across India. According to a Scroll.in report, electrical problems especially under high loads was the leading cause of hospital fires, the main reason for this vulnerability to electrical short circuits is the lack of dedicated electrical engineers in most hospitals and shortage of government electrical engineers in the various state public works departments. The same report found that between August 2020 to March 2022 there were 122 deaths due to 29 incidents of hospital fires during that period.
