= Stop TB Partnership =

Organization working to eliminate tuberculosis

The Stop TB Partnership
- Formation: March 2001; 25 years ago
- Legal status: Active
- Headquarters: Geneva, Switzerland
- Head: Executive Director; Lucica Ditiu
- Parent organization: UNOPS
- Website: stoptb.org

The Stop TB Partnership was established in 2001 to eliminate tuberculosis (TB) as a public health problem. Its 2,000 partner organizations include international, nongovernmental and governmental organizations, and patient groups. The secretariat is based in Geneva, Switzerland, and, since 2015, has been administered by UNOPS. Previously it was hosted by the World Health Organization.

It is governed by a Board, supported by two standing board committees, the Executive Committee, and the Finance Committee. The current Executive Director of the Stop TB Partnership is Lucica Ditiu. The STBP Board provides leadership and direction, ensures coordination within the Stop TB Partnership, and monitors the implementation of agreed policies, plans, and activities of the Secretariat. The Stop TB Partnership's working groups include the Child and Adolescent TB, End TB Transmission Initiative, Global Drug-resistant TB Initiative, Global Laboratory Initiative (GLI), New Diagnostics, New TB Drugs, New TB Vaccines, and Public–Private Mix (PPM) for TB Care and Prevention working groups.

== History ==
The Stop TB Initiative was established following the meeting of the First Session of the Ad Hoc Committee on the Tuberculosis Epidemic held in London in March 1998. In March 2000 the Stop TB Partnership produced the Amsterdam Declaration to Stop TB that called for action from ministerial delegations of 20 countries with the highest burden of TB. That same year the World Health Assembly endorsed the establishment of a Global Partnership to Stop TB.

== Global Plan to End Tuberculosis ==
The Global Plan to End TB, 2023-2030 is a plan for ending TB as a public health challenge by 2030. It is produced by the Stop TB Partnership and provides a blueprint of priority actions required and a detailed estimate of financial resources needed to end TB. The current Global Plan builds on the previous edition, which laid out priority actions for 2018-2022, informed by global commitments member states endorsed at the 2018 United Nations High-Level Meeting (UNHLM) on TB. The Global Plans include resource needs estimates that include resources needed for implementing TB care and prevention, and R&D into new tools. The Global Plan to End TB 2023-2030 informed the Global Fund Investment Case and the 2022 G20 deliberations on TB. It calls on funders to contribute $5 billion annually for TB R&D, but in 2021, only $1 billion was raised.

Prior to the Global Plan to End TB 2023-2030, five other plans were produced:

- The first Global Plan to Stop TB 2001-2005 provided a coherent agenda to rally key new partners, push forward research and development, and have a rapid impact on TB in the areas suffering most from the epidemic It focused on the emerging challenge of rising drug resistance in TB and HIV infection.
- The second Global Plan to Stop TB 2006-2015 was launched in Davos, Switzerland at the World Economic Forum. The total cost of the Plan - US$56 billion - represented a threefold increase in annual investment in TB control compared with the first Global Plan. The Plan set out to reduce TB incidence and reach the Partnership’s targets for 2015 of halving TB prevalence and deaths compared with 1990 levels.
- The third Global Plan to Stop TB 2011-2015 focused on scaling up existing interventions for the diagnosis and treatment of TB and introducing new technologies and notably new diagnostic tests.
- The fourth Global Plan to End TB 2016–2020 took the End TB Strategy as its foundation and provides countries and policymakers with a path towards achieving the Strategy’s milestones.
- The fifth Global Plan to End TB 2018-2022 aligned with the Political Declaration of the UN High-Level Meeting (UNHLM) on the Fight Against TB. It provided an estimate of the resources needed to achieve the targets and commitments set at the UNHLM on TB in September 2018 by the deadline of December 2022.

== Main activities ==
The Partnership's activities focus chiefly on raising awareness about TB and advocating for greater commitment to and funding for TB prevention, treatment and research.

=== Global Drug Facility ===
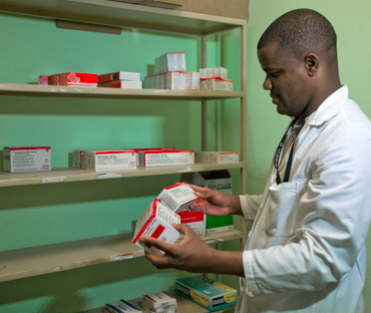
GDF Drugs distributed by doctors

The Stop TB Partnership’s Global Drug Facility (GDF) has worked closely with countries, suppliers, donors, and other stakeholders to vastly increase global access to affordable TB treatments, and diagnostics for people affected by TB. GDF delivers a market solution to a market failure by offering affordable, life-saving TB medicines, and diagnostic tools for countries that otherwise would not be able to access them and offering a financial return for drug and device developers.

=== TB REACH ===
The Stop TB Partnership TB Reach initiative is a multilateral funding mechanism that provides funding to partners to test innovative approaches and technologies to find and treat people with TB in the world’s most impoverished communities. TB REACH shows the importance of reaching people, whether with drones, donkeys, or young people on motorbikes, and whether using molecular tests, new drugs, or 125-year-old microscopy.

=== Challenge Facility for Civil Society ===
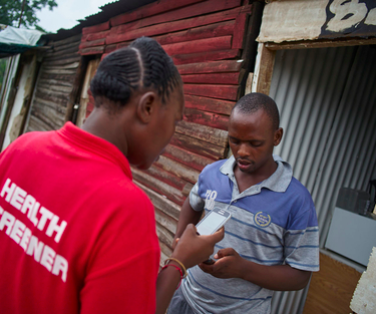
Reaching out to communities

The Stop TB Partnership Challenge Facility for Civil Society (CFCS), a grant mechanism supported by USAID, L'Initiative, Expertise France, and the Global Fund Strategic Initiative. CFCS empowers grassroots organizations and TB-affected communities often overlooked in the fight against tuberculosis. By funding technically sound interventions, CFCS aims to elevate these groups to recognized partners in both national and global TB responses. This support gives community and civil society actors to engage in advocacy, access essential services, and ensure governments uphold their commitments to the United Nations Political Declaration on TB. The goal is to foster networks within civil society and TB-affected communities.

=== EXPAND-TB ===
EXPAND-TB (Expanding Access to New Diagnostics for TB) is a UNITAID-funded project launched in 2009, which aims to increase access to tuberculosis (TB) diagnostic tests in 27 endemic countries. It is a collaboration between World Health Organization (WHO), the Stop TB Partnership’s Global Laboratory Initiative (GLI) and Global Drug Facility (GDF), and the Foundation for Innovative New Diagnostics (FIND).

The overall goal of the project is to narrow the huge diagnostic gap in multi-drug-resistant tuberculosis (MDR-TB) control by expanding and accelerating access to new and rapid diagnostic technologies within appropriate laboratory services, accompanied by the necessary technology transfer, and ensuring these new technologies are properly integrated within TB control programmes.

== Reviews ==
=== GiveWell review ===
Charity evaluator GiveWell first reviewed the Stop TB Partnership in July 2009. At the time, the Stop TB Partnership was given a 3 star rating, the highest possible. Until November 2011, the Stop TB Partnership was among GiveWell's top-rated charities, second only to VillageReach.

In November 2011, GiveWell published an updated review of Stop TB and concluded that "The Stop TB Partnership does not currently qualify for our highest ratings." They elaborated by saying that: "As of November 2011, we do not have a clear understanding of Stop TB's room for more funding. We have discussed this question with Stop TB and hope to improve our understanding of this in the future."

=== Employee treatment ===
On September 12, 2020, The New York Times published an article on the Stop TB Partnership titled "A Global Health Star Under Fire". The article states that "the leader of a global campaign to prevent tuberculosis has been accused of bullying and harassing employees, and creating a poisonous work environment especially for people of color, according to interviews with current and former staff members and internal documents obtained by The New York Times."

The Treatment Action Group released a statement condemning the reported bullying, harassment, and racism at the Stop TB Partnership and called on the Stop TB Partnership Board to commission an independent review into the allegations.
