= FIND, the global alliance for diagnostics =

Swiss global health nonprofit organization

FIND
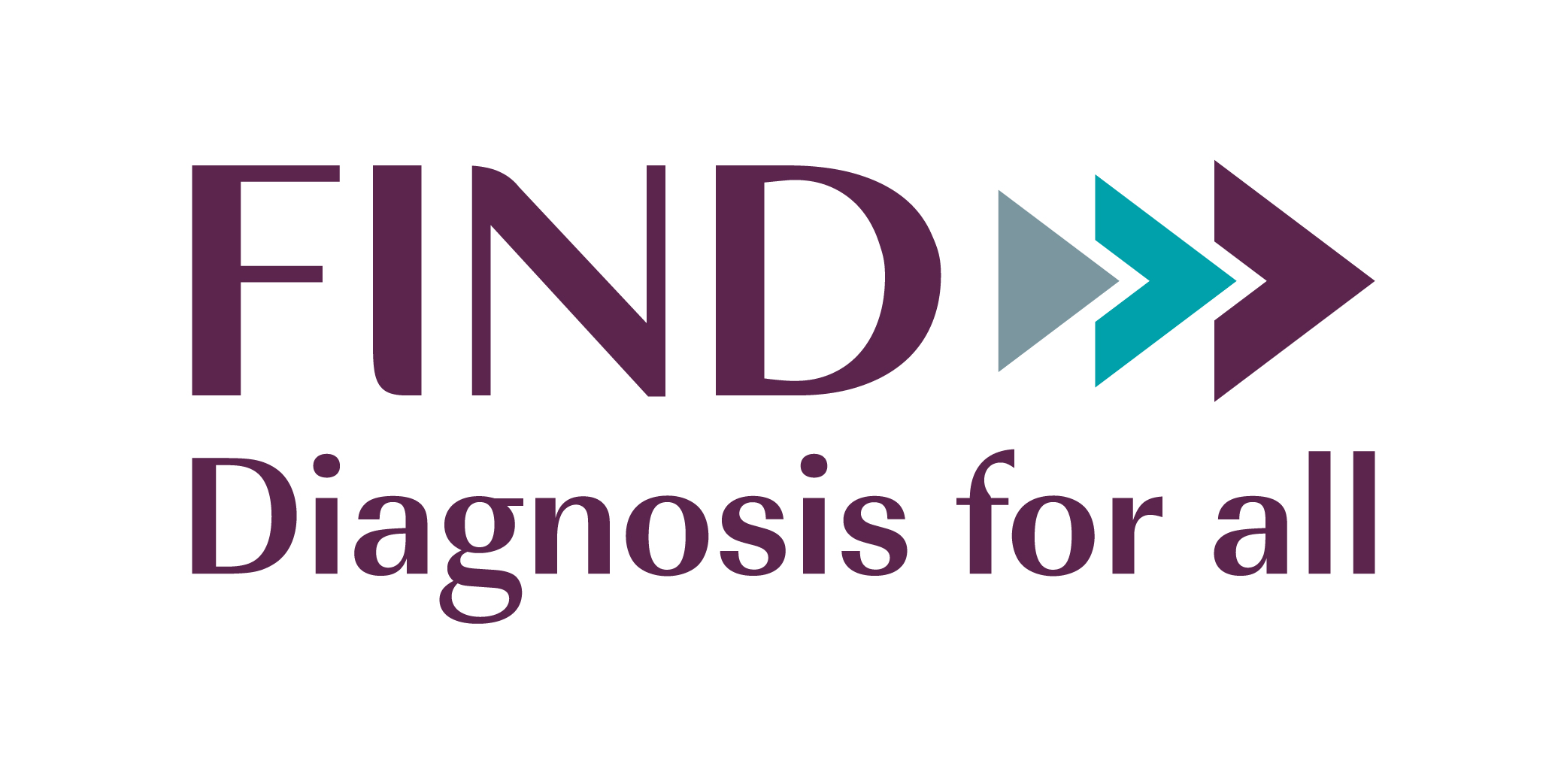
- Formation: 2003
- Headquarters: Geneva
- Location: Global Health Campus
- Fields: Global health, Diagnostics
- CEO: Ifedayo Adetifa
- Website: www.finddx.org

FIND (Foundation for Innovative New Diagnostics) is a global health non-profit based in Geneva, Switzerland. FIND functions as a product development partnership, engaging in active collaboration with over 150 partners to facilitate the development, evaluation, and implementation of diagnostic tests for poverty-related diseases. The organisation's Geneva headquarters are in the Global Health Campus (GHC) . Country offices are located in Nairobi, Kenya; New Delhi, India; Cape Town, South Africa; and Hanoi, Viet Nam.

== History ==
FIND was launched at the 56th World Health Assembly in 2003 in response to the critical need for innovative and affordable diagnostic tests for diseases in low- and middle-income countries.

The initiative was launched by the Bill and Melinda Gates Foundation and WHO's Special Programme for Research and Training in Tropical Diseases (TDR), and its initial focus was to speed up the development and evaluation of tuberculosis tests.

In 2011, FIND was recognized as an "Other International Organization" by the Swiss Government, alongside DNDi and Medicines for Malaria Venture.

== Priorities ==
The organization focuses on improving diagnosis in several disease areas, including hepatitis C, HIV, malaria, neglected tropical diseases (sleeping sickness, Chagas disease, leishmaniasis, buruli ulcer), and tuberculosis. Alongside this, FIND works on diagnostic connectivity, antimicrobial resistance, acute febrile illness, and outbreak preparedness.

To support this work, FIND engages in development of target product profiles, maintains clinical trial platforms, manages specimen banks, negotiates preferential product pricing for developing markets, and creates and implements trainings and lab strengthening tools.

In 2020, FIND became a co-convener of the Diagnostics Pillar of the Access to COVID-19 Tools Accelerator with The Global Fund to Fight AIDS, Tuberculosis and Malaria. Together they supported the development of reliable rapid antigen tests for COVID-19, and guaranteed access to 120 million rapid tests at an affordable price to low- and middle-income countries.

FIND also aims at improving the diagnostics ecosystem by working on activities such as sequencing, managing a biobank network to facilitate diagnostic development across diseases, helping countries optimize their networks of diagnostic services, and developing digital tools, such as algorithms, that can help healthcare workers provide better diagnosis.

== Recent achievements ==
From 2015 to 2020, fifteen new diagnostic technologies supported by FIND received regulatory clearance, and 10 of them were in use by the end of 2020 in low- and middle-income countries.

One example of such tests is Abbott's BIOLINE HAT 2.0, a rapid test for African trypanosomiasis, a disease also known as sleeping sickness. In 2021 Abbott donated 450,000 of these tests to scale up testing in low- and middle-income countries.

Over the same period, FIND supported the development of four multi-disease diagnostic platforms:

- Cepheid's GeneXpert MTB/RIF for simultaneous rapid tuberculosis diagnosis and rapid antibiotic sensitivity test
- Eiken's LAMP platform for the detection of diseases including tuberculosis, malaria, sleeping sickness and leishmaniasis
- Molbio's Truenat, a point-of-care rapid molecular test for diagnosis of infectious diseases
- DCN's Fluoro rapid test for gonorrhoea

In April 2020, the World Health Organization launched the ACT-Accelerator partnership, a global collaboration to accelerate the development, production and equitable distribution of vaccines, diagnostics and therapeutics for COVID-19. Leading the diagnostic pillar together with The Global Fund to Fight AIDS, Tuberculosis and Malaria, FIND has worked to enable access to tests by boosting research and development, Emergency Use Listing, independent assessment, and manufacturing of tests.

Together with partners FIND has developed and made available online courses and training packages for healthcare workers on COVID-19 testing.

FIND has also created a portal to provide an overview of the COVID-19 testing landscape, including a directory of COVID-19 diagnostics commercialized., and a tracker centralizing all the data reported by the countries on COVID-19 tests performed, incidence, deaths and positivity rate.

== Funding and leadership ==
FIND receives its funding from more than thirty donors, including bilateral and multilateral organizations as well as private foundations.

Members of the Board of Directors include Ayoade (Yodi) Alakija, Thomas Cueni, Michèle Costafrolaz, Hatem Amer, Marcel Tanner, Rakan Khalid Bin Dohaish, and Ifedayo Adetifa.
