= Tuberculosis verrucosa cutis =

Skin rash of small, red nodules due to infection by M. tuberculosis

- Other names: Lupus verrucosus, prosector's wart, warty tuberculosis anatomist's wart, verruca necrogenica
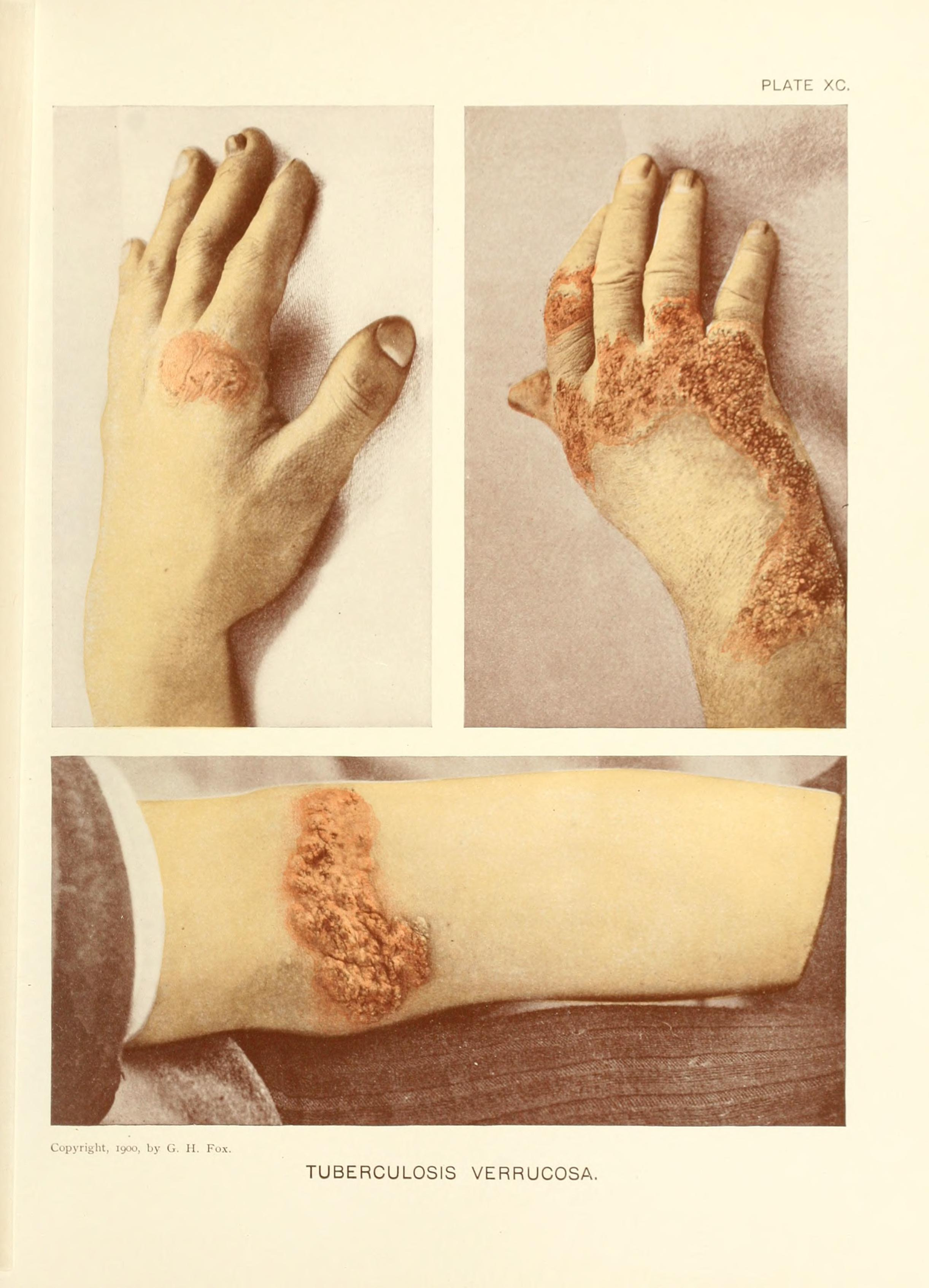
- Specialty: Infectious disease

Tuberculosis verrucosa cutis is a rash of small, red papules and nodules in the skin that may appear two to four weeks after inoculation by Mycobacterium tuberculosis in a previously infected and immunocompetent individual.

It is also known as "prosector's wart" because it was a common occupational disease of prosectors, the preparers of dissections and autopsies. Reinfection by tuberculosis via the skin, therefore, can result from accidental exposure to human tuberculous tissue in physicians, pathologists and laboratory workers; or to tissues of other infected animals, in veterinarians, butchers, etc.

TVC is one of the many forms of cutaneous tuberculosis, such as the tuberculous chancre (which results from the cutaneous inoculation in immunocompetent people without previous exposure), and the reactivation cutaneous tuberculosis (the most common form, which appears in previously infected patients). Other forms of cutaneous tuberculosis are: lupus vulgaris, scrofuloderma, lichen scrofulosorum, erythema induratum and the papulonecrotic tuberculid.

It was described by René Laennec in 1826.

== Signs and symptoms ==
Because the TVC's entry point usually is the site of a trauma, wound or puncture in the skin (during an autopsy, for example), the most frequent site for the wart are the hands. But it can occur anywhere in the skin, such as in the sole of the feet, in the anus, and, in the case of children from developing countries, in the buttocks and knees. This is because children from countries of high incidence of tuberculosis can contract the lesion after contact with tuberculous sputum, by walking barefoot, sitting or playing on the ground.

When recent, the skin lesion has the outside appearance of a wart or verruca, thus it can be confused with other kinds of warts. It evolves to an annular red-brown plaque with time, with central healing and gradual expansion in the periphery. In this phase, it can be confused with fungal infections such as blastomycosis and chromoblastomycosis.

== Diagnosis ==
The diagnosis is confirmed by a skin biopsy and a positive culture for acid-fast bacilli. A PPD test may also result positive.

== Treatment ==
Therapy for cutaneous tuberculosis is the same as for systemic tuberculosis, and usually consists of a 4-drug regimen, i.e., isoniazid, rifampin, pyrazinamide, and ethambutol or streptomycin.

== See also ==
- Tuberculosis
- Tuberculosis classification
- Tuberculosis diagnosis
- Tuberculosis treatment
- Prosector's paronychia
