= Tuberculosis classification =

Classification system for tuberculosis

== Tuberculosis classification system (US) ==
As of April 2000, the American clinical classification system for tuberculosis (TB) is based on the pathogenesis of the disease.

Health care providers should comply with local laws and regulations requiring the reporting of TB. All persons with class 3 or class 5 TB should be reported promptly to the local health department.

Classification System for TB
Class	Type	Description
0	No TB exposure Not infected	No history of exposure Negative reaction to tuberculin skin test
1	TB exposure No evidence of infection	History of exposure Negative reaction to tuberculin skin test
2	TB infection No disease	Positive reaction to tuberculin skin test Negative bacteriologic studies (if done); No clinical, bacteriologic, or radiographic evidence of TB
3	TB, clinically active	M. tuberculosis cultured (if done); Clinical, bacteriologic, or radiographic evidence of current disease
4	TB; Not clinically active	History of episode(s) of TB or Abnormal but stable radiographic findings Positive reaction to the tuberculin skin test Negative bacteriologic studies (if done) and No clinical or radiographic evidence of current disease
5	TB suspect	Diagnosis pending TB disease should be ruled in or out within 3 months

== CDC TB classification for immigrants and refugees ==
The U.S. Citizenship and Immigration Services has an additional TB classification for immigrants and refugees developed by the Centers for Disease Control and Prevention (CDC). The B notification program is an important screening strategy to identify new arrivals who have a high risk for TB.

United States Immigrant/Refugee TB Classification - revised 2009
Class	Description
None	No TB Classification (Normal)
A	TB with positive sputum smear (considered infectious; requires a waiver to enter US)
B1	Overseas evidence of TB with negative sputum smear (considered non-infectious; includes pulmonary and extrapulmonary); includes "old healed TB" and previously treated TB
B2	Latent TB Infection (LTBI) defined as tuberculin skin test ≥ 10 mm
B3	TB contact

== See also ==
- list of notifiable diseases
- Tuberculosis radiology for CXR details
- Tuberculosis diagnosis
