= Clemens von Pirquet =

Austrian physician (1874–1929)

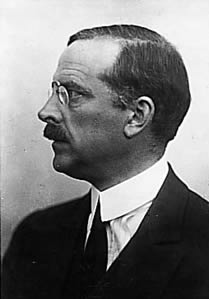
- Clemens von Pirquet (1906)
- Born: 12 May 1874; Hirschstetten near Vienna
- Died: 28 February 1929 (aged 54); Vienna
- Known for: tuberculosis allergy
- Scientific career
- Fields: pediatrics; bacteriology; immunology

Clemens Peter Freiherr von Pirquet (12 May 1874 – 28 February 1929) was an Austrian scientist and pediatrician best known for his contributions to the fields of bacteriology and immunology.

== Career ==
Born in Vienna, he studied theology at the University of Innsbruck and philosophy at the University of Leuven before he enrolled at the University of Graz where he became a doctor of medicine in 1900. He started practicing at the Children's Clinic in Vienna.

In 1906 he noticed that patients who had previously received injections of horse serum or smallpox vaccine had quicker, more severe reactions to a second injection. He coined the word allergy (from the Greek allos meaning "other" and ergon meaning "work") to describe this hypersensitivity reaction.

Soon after, the observation with smallpox led Pirquet to realize that tuberculin, which Robert Koch isolated from the bacteria that cause tuberculosis in 1890, might lead to a similar type of reaction. Charles Mantoux expanded upon Pirquet's ideas and the Mantoux test, in which tuberculin is injected into the skin, became a diagnostic test for tuberculosis in 1907.

In 1909 he declined proposals to take a position at the Pasteur Institute in Paris and to become a professor at the Johns Hopkins University. In 1910 he returned to Europe taking positions in Breslau (now Wrocław) and then Vienna.

== Suicide ==
On 28 February 1929 Clemens von Pirquet and his wife committed suicide with potassium cyanide.

== See also ==
- Guido von Pirquet
