= Vitamin D binding protein domain III =

VitD-bind_III
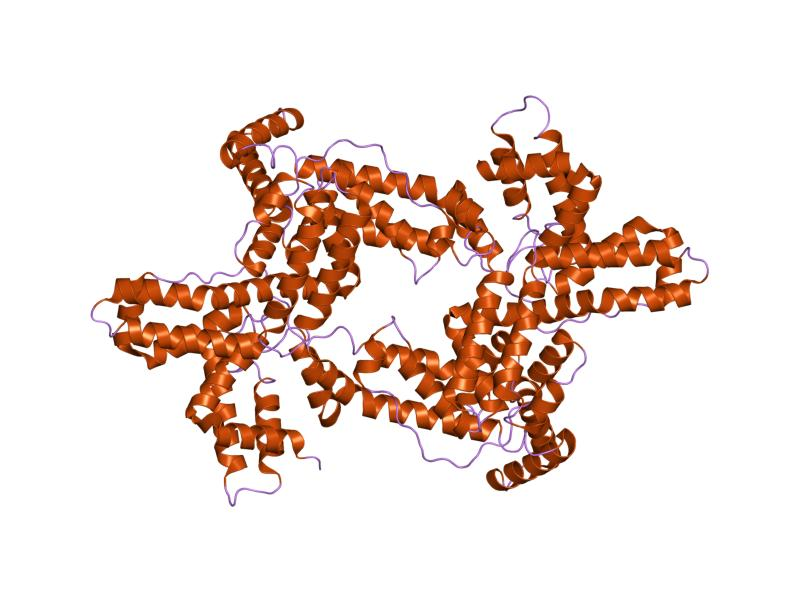
- crystal structure of uncomplexed vitamin d-binding protein

Identifiers
- Symbol: VitD-bind_III
- Pfam: PF09164
- Pfam clan: CL0282
- InterPro: IPR015247
- SCOP2: 1kxp / SCOPe / SUPFAM
Available protein structures:
- Pfam: structures / ECOD
- PDB: RCSB PDB; PDBe; PDBj
- PDBsum: structure summary

In molecular biology, Vitamin D binding protein domain III protein domain is predominantly found in Vitamin D binding proteins (DBP). Vitamin D-binding protein (DBP)(also referred to as Gc-globulin) is synthesized primarily in the liver. This entry outlines the domain III of DBP. Domain III (amino acid 379–458) is G-actin binding region located in the C-terminal. Domain (amino acids 373 to 403). This protein is found ubiquitously in vivo in significant quantities and can be detected in all fluid compartments. During acute phase inflammatory response, DBP levels tend to increase.

== Function ==
DBP has several functions. More precisely, domain III has the specific function of being an extracellular scavenger for G-actin released from necrotic cells at sites of tissue injury.

== Structure ==
DBP domain III has a multihelical structure. It is required for formation of an actin 'clamp', allowing the protein to bind to actin. This protein is a member of the albumin gene family and has the characteristic multiple disulfide-bonded, triple domain structure.
