= Anticancer Fund =

Belgian foundation that provides information about cancers and therapies

The Anticancer Fund (ACF) is a Belgian private not-for-profit foundation that provides evidence-based information for patients about cancers and therapies.

== History ==
Officially established in 2013, the foundation has grown from Reliable Cancer Therapies (RCT), a non-profit organization established in 2009. RCT is still operational today, but the foundation has taken over many of its tasks as well as the goals.

== Activities ==
The vision of the ACF is to expand the amount of possible treatment options for cancer. The mission of the Anticancer Fund is to cure all people who suffer from cancer. This is done on two levels: information and research.

=== Information ===
One of the main activities of the anticancer Fund is providing the public with scientifically accurate information regarding cancer and treatments. This includes information on the different types of cancer, treatments (both conventional and non-conventional) and other information related to cancer and therapies. The Anticancer Fund holds a HON-certificate for the information that can be found on its website.

Part of ACF's activities in the information section focus on exposing false and potentially lethal information. This fits in with the goal of providing evidence-based information concerning cancer and cancer treatments. An example of this is the drug GcMAF, which has been promoted as a miracle cure for several illnesses including cancer, but for which those results were never confirmed by independent study.

Dr Pan Pantziarka is the organisation's spokesman in the United Kingdom.

=== Research ===
In terms of research, the ACF develops promising treatment options for patients, which is done on an international scale. The ACF collaborates with other researchers across the European continent to advance the development of cures. The ACF also funds promising research projects financially. For example, the ACF is partaking in the CUSP9 trials, which focuses on the re-purposing of drugs for the treatment of cancer. It has formed a partnership called the Repurposing Drugs in Oncology project with the American GlobalCures to investigate the use of existing medicines with novel uses. It has identified Diclofenac, a common painkiller, as having significant anti-cancer properties. It is also investigating the use of nitroglycerin.

== Funding ==
ACF’s funding comes from a private fund, as well donations from individuals who wish to support the cause of the Anticancer Fund.
