= GcMAF =

Protein produced by artificial modification of vitamin D-binding protein

GcMAF (or Gc protein-derived macrophage activating factor) is a protein produced by modification of vitamin D-binding protein. It has been promoted as a treatment for various medical conditions, but claims of its benefits are not supported by evidence.

Once proclaimed a 'magic protein' capable of curing cancer, GcMAF has been proven ineffective. The case sheds light on how far scammers are willing to go to exploit desperate cancer patients and their families for financial gain.

— Public warning issued by the Anticancer Fund

Biochemically, GcMAF results from sequential deglycosylation of the vitamin D-binding protein (the Gc protein), which is naturally promoted by lymphocytes (B and T cells). The resulting protein may be a macrophage activating factor (MAF). MAFs are lymphokines that control the expression of antigens on the surface of macrophages, and one of their functions is to make macrophages become cytotoxic to tumors.

== False claims ==
Since around 2008, GcMAF has been promoted as a cure for cancer, HIV, autism and other conditions.

Three out of four of the original studies authored by Yamamoto (published between 2007 and 2009) were retracted by the scientific journals in which they were published in 2014, officially due to irregularities in the way ethical approval was granted. Retraction reasons also included methodological errors in the studies. The integrity of the research, conducted by Nobuto Yamamoto and colleagues, that originally prompted claims regarding cancer and HIV has been questioned.

The UK Medicines and Healthcare products Regulatory Agency and Cancer Research UK has warned the public about spurious claims of clinical benefits, misleadingly based on reduced levels of the alpha-N-acetylgalactosaminidase enzyme (also known as nagalase), whose production might be increased in many cancers.

In 2014 the Belgian Anticancer Fund communicated serious concerns about published studies on GcMAF by Yamamoto and colleagues.

In 2015 the UK Medicines and Healthcare products Regulatory Agency (MHRA) closed a factory in Milton, Cambridgeshire owned by David Noakes' company Immuno Biotech that manufactured GcMAF for cancer treatment.

In September 2018 Noakes pleaded guilty in UK to manufacturing a medicinal product without a manufacturer's licence, selling or supplying medicinal products without market authorisation, and money laundering, and sentenced to 15 months of jail. In April 2021 Noakes pleaded guilty in France to manufacturing and selling fake medicinal products and cosmetics by Internet and sentenced to 4 years of jail.

A 2019 Business Insider report detailed the activities of Amanda Mary Jewell, who sold GcMAF for years as an unlicensed cure for several medical conditions, including cancer and autism. Jewell is not a medical doctor.

== First generation GcMAF ==
Gc protein-derived macrophage-activating factor (GcMAF).

GcMAF initially conceptualized by Nobuto Yamamoto in 1991, has been researched as a possible cancer treatment. Previous research efforts involved the isolation of Gc protein (1f1f subtype) from human serum through an affinity column modified with 25-hydroxyvitamin D3. GcMAF was enzymatically derived from the isolated Gc protein.

== New generation of GcMAF from Japan ==
The 2nd and 3rd generation GcMAF were developed by the Japanese organizations which hold the patents: in the USA (2014, 2016, 2017), Japan (2015), the EU (2016), Australia (2016), Israel (2018).

== See also ==
- List of ineffective cancer treatments
