= Tine test =

Medical test for tuberculosis

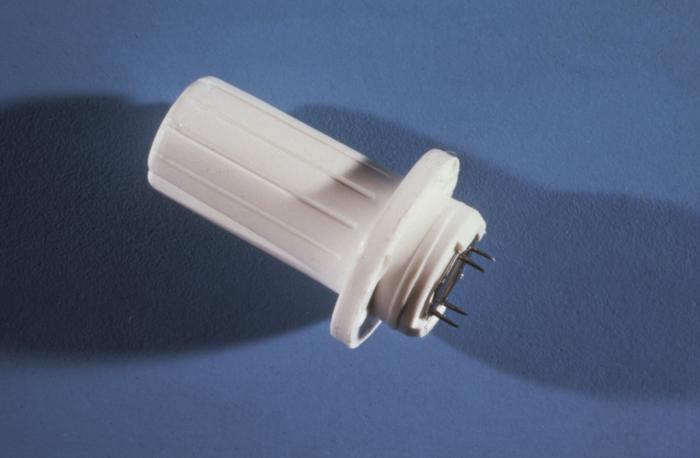
- Tine test
- Purpose: diagnosis for tuberculosis

The tine test is a multiple-puncture tuberculin skin test used to aid in the medical diagnosis of tuberculosis (TB). The tine test is similar to the Heaf test, although the Mantoux test is typically used instead. There are various forms of the tine tests which usually fall into two categories: the old tine test (OT) and the purified protein derivative (PPD) tine test. Common brand names of the test include Aplisol, Aplitest, Tuberculin PPD TINE TEST, and Tubersol.

== Procedure ==
This test uses a small "button" that has four to six short needles coated with TB antigens (tuberculin), either an old tuberculin or a PPD-tuberculin. The needles are pressed into the skin (usually on the inner side of the forearm), forcing the antigens into the skin. The test is then read 48 to 72 hours later by measuring the size of the largest papule or induration. Indications are usually classified as positive, negative, or doubtful.

== Comparison to Mantoux test ==
The American Thoracic Society or Centers for Disease Control and Prevention (CDC) do not recommend the tine test. They consider it to be less reliable because the amount of tuberculin that enters the skin cannot be measured. According to a 1980 paper, because it is not possible to control precisely the amount of tuberculin used in the tine test, a positive test should be verified using the Mantoux test.

Contrary to this, however, studies have shown that the tine test can give results that correlate well to the Mantoux test. If a minor reaction is considered doubtful, the OT test is less accurate and may fail to detect TB, producing a false negative. If all doubtful indications are instead classified as positive, there is no significant difference between the OT test, the PPD tine test, or the Mantoux test.

Furthermore, the tine test is faster and easier to administer than the Mantoux test and has been recommended for screening children.
