= Heaf test =

Skin test for tuberculosis in children

- Purpose: test tuberculosis in children (discontinued)

The Heaf test, a diagnostic skin test, was long performed to determine whether or not children had been exposed to tuberculosis infection. The test was named after F. R. G. Heaf. Also known as the Sterneedle test, it was administered by a Heaf gun (trademarked "Sterneedle"), a spring-loaded instrument with six needles arranged in a circular formation which was inserted in the wrist or shoulder.

The Heaf test was discontinued in 2005 because the manufacturer deemed its production to be financially unsustainable after manufacturers could not be found for tuberculin or Heaf guns. Until 2005, the test was used in the United Kingdom to determine whether the BCG vaccine was needed; the Mantoux test is now used instead. The Heaf test was preferred in the UK, because it was thought to be easier to interpret, with less variability between observers, and less training was required to administer and read the test.

Patients who exhibited a negative reaction to the test were considered for BCG vaccination.

The Heaf test was used to test for tuberculosis in adolescents aged around 13–14.

== Procedure ==
A Heaf gun was used to inject multiple samples of testing serum under the skin at once. The needle points were dipped in tuberculin purified protein derivative (PPD) and pricked into the skin. A Heaf gun with disposable single-use heads was recommended.

The gun injected PPD equivalent to 100,000 units per ml to the skin over the flexor surface of the left forearm in a circular pattern of six. The test was read between two and seven days later. The injection could not be into sites containing superficial veins.

The reading of the Heaf test was defined by a scale:

- Negative – no induration, maybe six minute puncture scars
- Grade 1 – four to six papules (also considered negative)
- Grade 2 – confluent papules form indurated ring (positive)
- Grade 3 – central filling to form disc (positive)
- Grade 4 – disc >10 mm with or without blistering (strongly positive)

Grades 1 and 2 could result from previous BCG or avian tuberculosis, rather than human TB infection.

Children who were found to have a grade 3 or 4 reaction were referred for X-ray and follow-up.

For interpretation of the test, see Tuberculosis diagnosis.

== Other tests ==
The equivalent Mantoux test positive levels done with 10 TU (0.1 mL 100 TU/mL, 1:1000) are

- 0–4 mm induration (Heaf 0-1)
- 5–14 mm induration (Heaf 2)
- >15 mm induration (Heaf 3-4)

The Mantoux test is preferred in the United States for the diagnosis of tuberculosis; multiple puncture tests, such as the Heaf test and Tine test, are not recommended.
