= F. R. G. Heaf =

Frederick Roland George Heaf CMG FRCP (21 June 1894 – 4 February 1973), until 1916 Fritz Rudolf Georg Hief, was a British physician.

He was born in Desborough, Northamptonshire, England, of German ancestry. He attended Sidney Sussex College, Cambridge, and St Thomas' Hospital as a medical student, where his studies were interrupted by the First World War. in 1915 he volunteered for the Friends' Ambulance Unit, where he served briefly, but was then allowed to complete his medical studies, qualifying in 1918. As a conscientious objector he joined the Royal Army Medical Corps, and was eventually promoted captain. After the war he followed a career in Public Health and became a professor at the University of Wales in 1949. His lifelong interest was in tuberculosis, and the test formerly used in the UK for immunity to TB was named after him.

== Publications ==
Rehabilitating the Tuberculous – F. R. G. Heaf and John Bowes McDougall (1945)

Recent advances in respiratory tuberculosis – F. R. G. Heaf (1968) ISBN 0-7000-1330-X
