= Primary inoculation tuberculosis =

- Other names: Cutaneous primary complex, Primary tuberculous complex, and Tuberculous chancre
- Specialty: Infectious diseases

Primary inoculation tuberculosis is a skin condition that develops at the site of inoculation of tubercle bacilli into a tuberculosis-free individual.

== See also ==
- Tuberculosis verrucosa cutis
- Skin lesion
- List of cutaneous conditions
