= Vitamin D-binding protein =

Mammalian protein found in Homo sapiens

GC
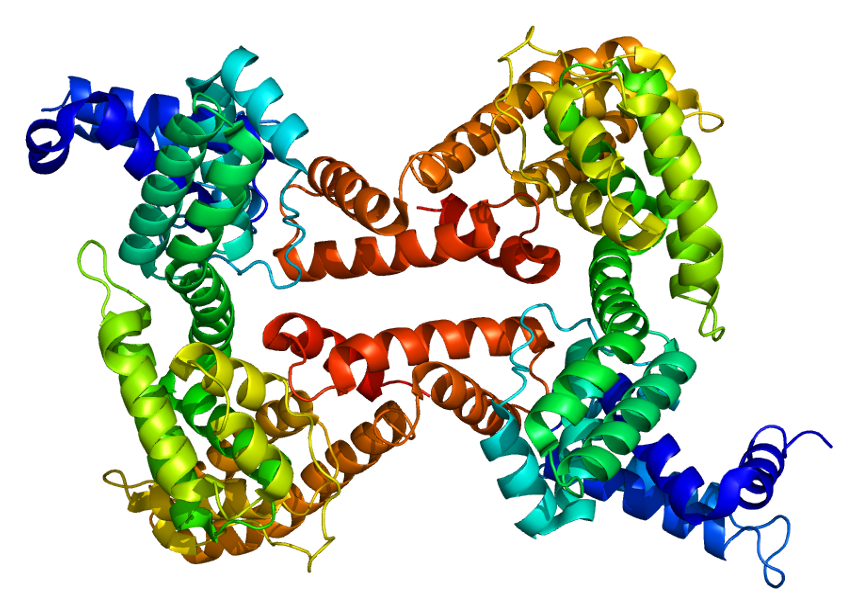

Identifiers
- Aliases: GC, DBP, DBP/GRD3, HEL-S-51, VDBG, VDBP, Gc-MAF, GcMAF, vitamin D binding protein, DBP-maf, VDB, GC vitamin D binding protein
- External IDs: OMIM: 139200; MGI: 95669; GeneCards: GC
Available structures
PDB	Ortholog search: PDBe RCSB
PDB	List of PDB id codes 1J78, 1J7E, 1KW2, 1KXP, 1LOT, 1MA9

Gene location (Human)
Chr.	Chromosome 4 (human)
Band	4q13.3	Start	71,741,696 bp
Band	4q13.3	End	71,804,041 bp

Gene location (Mouse)
Chr.	Chromosome 5 (mouse)
Band	5 E1|5 44.32 cM	Start	89,565,381 bp
Band	5 E1|5 44.32 cM	End	89,605,757 bp
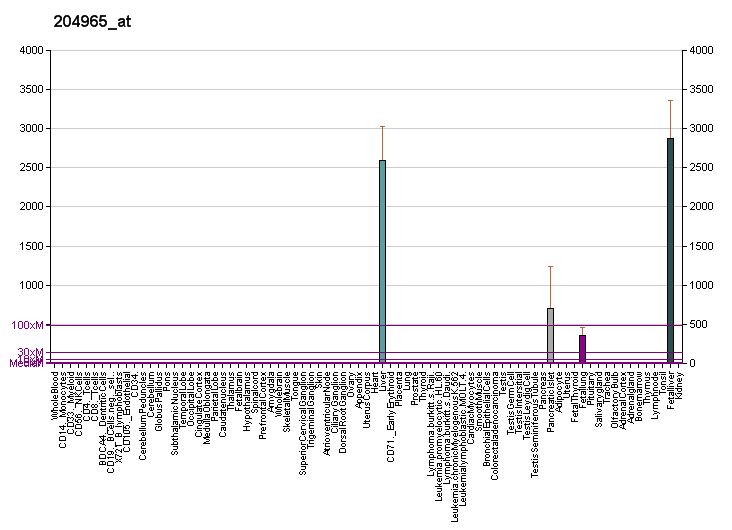
RNA expression pattern
Bgee	Human / Mouse (ortholog); Top expressed in: liver; right lobe of liver; gallbladder; pancreatic ductal cell; beta cell; duodenum; body of pancreas; jejunal mucosa; testicle; gonad / Top expressed in: left lobe of liver; gallbladder; islet of Langerhans; fetal liver hematopoietic progenitor cell; human fetus; right kidney; human kidney; sexually immature organism; morula; stomach; More reference expression data
BioGPS	More reference expression data
Gene ontology
Molecular function	vitamin D binding; calcidiol binding; actin binding; vitamin transmembrane transporter activity
Cellular component	blood microparticle; extracellular region; lysosomal lumen; extracellular exosome; extracellular space; cytosol
Biological process	vitamin D metabolic process; vitamin transport; transport; vitamin transmembrane transport
Sources:Amigo / QuickGO
Orthologs
Databases	NCBI: entry; OMA: entry
Species	Human	Mouse
Entrez	2638	14473
Ensembl	ENSG00000145321	ENSMUSG00000035540
UniProt	P02774	P21614
RefSeq (mRNA)	NM_000583; NM_001204306; NM_001204307	NM_008096
RefSeq (protein)	NP_000574; NP_001191235; NP_001191236	NP_032122
Location (UCSC)	Chr 4: 71.74 – 71.8 Mb	Chr 5: 89.57 – 89.61 Mb
PubMed search
- Wikidata
View/Edit Human	View/Edit Mouse

GC Vitamin D binding protein, also referred to as Vitamin D binding protein (DBP), is a protein that is encoded by the GC gene in Homo sapiens (modern humans). DBP is genetically the oldest member of the albuminoid family and appeared early in the evolution of vertebrates.

== Structure ==
Human GC is a glycosylated alpha-globulin, 52.92 kDa in size. Its 474 amino acids are encoded by a sequence of 1685 nucleotides (including the nucleotides preceding the protein-coding section, composed of the 5' UTR and 3' UTR) located at 4q13.3. The primary structure contains 28 cysteine residues forming multiple disulfide bonds. GC contains 3 domains. Domain 1 is composed of 10 alpha helices, domain 2 of 9, and domain 3 of 4.

== Function ==
Vitamin D-binding protein belongs to the albumin gene family, together with human serum albumin and alpha-fetoprotein. It is a multifunctional protein found in plasma, ascitic fluid, cerebrospinal fluid (CSF), and on the surface of many cell types.

It binds to various forms of vitamin D, including ergocalciferol (vitamin D_{2}) and cholecalciferol (vitamin D_{3}), the 25-hydroxylated forms (calcifediol), and the active hormonal product, 1,25-dihydroxyvitamin D (calcitriol). The major proportion of vitamin D in blood is bound to this protein. Once bound, it transports vitamin D and its plasma metabolites between the skin, liver, and kidney, and then on to the various target tissues. The expression of GC, and therefore the production of GC Vitamin D binding protein, is restricted towards the liver; in an RNA-sequence (RNA-seq) study of tissues samples from 95 human individuals across 27 tissue representations analysed on December 19, 2024, GC was expressed primarily in the tissue of the liver, at a mean RPKM (reads per kilobase million) value of 1258.79 ± 214.721 across 3 samples. In comparison, the next highest RPKM means were in the anatomically nearby gallbladder, at a value of 235.12 ± 73.639 across 3 samples, followed by the stomach, at a value of 23.974 ± 19.053 across 3 samples, the duodenum, at a value of 22.508 ± 6.514 across 2 samples, and the kidney, at a value of 12.033 ± 12.168 across 4 samples. Other tissue samples held a negligible value in comparison to the liver, gallbladder, stomach, duodenum, and kidney.

Beyond acting as the carrier protein for vitamin D and its metabolites, DBP also transports free fatty acids, binds to actin and may help prevent actin polymerization during tissue injury. It also might serve as a macrophage activator, contributing to the inflammatory response by modulating T-cell activity.

As Gc protein-derived macrophage activating factor it is a Macrophage Activating Factor (MAF) that has been tested for use as a cancer treatment that would activate macrophages against cancer cells.

== Production ==
It is synthesized by hepatic parenchymal cells and secreted into the blood circulation.

== Regulation ==
The transcription factor HFN1α is a positive regulator while HFN1β is a dominant negative regulator of DBP expression.

== Evolution ==
Phylogenetic analyses suggest that DBP diverged from ancestral albumin through gene duplication events that occurred after the separation of jawless fish (cyclostomes) from jawed vertebrates approximately 450 million years ago. This timeline is supported by the apparent absence of DBP-like proteins in lampreys and hagfish, though these organisms retain vitamin D transport capability through alternative lipoprotein-mediated mechanisms. DBP is found throughout jawed vertebrates, from bony fish to mammals, suggesting its evolution coincided with the development of calcified skeletons and more sophisticated calcium homeostasis requirements.

== Variation ==
Many genetic variants of the GC gene are known. They produce 6 main haplotypes and 3 main protein variants (Gc1S, Gc1F and Gc2). The genetic variations are associated with differences in circulating 25-hydroxyvitamin D levels. They have been proposed to account for some of the differences in vitamin D status in different ethnic groups, and have been found to correlate with the response to vitamin D supplementation.
