= Macrophage-activating factor =

A macrophage-activating factor (MAF) is a lymphokine or other receptor based signal that primes macrophages towards cytotoxicity to tumors, cytokine secretion, or clearance of pathogens. Similar molecules may cause development of an inhibitory, regulatory phenotype. A MAF can also alter the ability of macrophages to present MHC I antigen, participate in Th responses, and/or affect other immune responses.

MAFs act typically in combination to produce a specific phenotype.

== Macrophage activated phenotypes ==
Macrophages inherently display tissue and environment-dependent plasticity. In addition, the phenotypes of the macrophages in a certain environment play a fundamental role in determining the immune activity and response within the tissue.

Depending on the combination of MAFs signaling to the macrophage, the macrophage’s activated phenotype becomes one of three major categories: classically activated, wound healing, or regulatory. Regulatory-phenotype macrophages have only recently been recognized as an important contributor to tissue microenvironments.

Tumor-associated macrophages may be any of these types, and they have been found to be important players in the tumor microenvironment. Analysis of the macrophage population and signaling in a tumor may provide useful clinical data.

=== Clarifications on terminology ===
- Macrophages have been classified as M1 or M2 depending on the adaptive immune response that elicited the phenotype: Th1 or Th2 respectively.
- The phrase 'alternatively activated macrophage' is used to refer to M2 macrophages.
- Regulatory macrophages do not fit into the M1/M2 classification system, and they display different markers.

=== Classically activated macrophages ===
After receiving signaling from both IFNγ and TNF, macrophages acquire a phenotype with higher activity against both pathogens and tumor cells. They also secrete inflammatory cytokines. IFNγ signaling can initially originate from Natural Killer (NK) cells, but adaptive immune cells are required to sustain a population of classically activated macrophages.

Toll-like receptor agonists may also cause macrophage activation.

=== Wound healing macrophages ===
Interleukin 4, secreted by granulocytes after tissue damage or by adaptive immune cells within a Th2 response, causes macrophages to secrete minimal amounts of pro-inflammatory cytokines and to have lower activity against intracellular pathogens. They also promote extracellular matrix synthesis via production of ornithine, via arginase; this is used as a precursor for extracellular matrix components. The overall result is a macrophage population that promotes wound healing.

The specific roles macrophages play in the Th2 response are still under investigation.

=== Regulatory macrophages ===
Glucocorticoids can contribute to the development of regulatory macrophages. These macrophages produce Interleukin 10 and inhibit immune system response (See below for Effect on cancer). Tumor-associated macrophages may contain a large population of regulatory macrophages.

== Effect on cancer ==
Initially, MAFs were thought to increase a macrophage’s cytotoxic response, allowing enhanced clearance of the tumor cells. However, they also have wider ranging effects. Chronic inflammation associated with activated macrophages may lead to the development of neoplasia, such as those found surrounding tuberculosis scars.

Dysregulation of macrophage activation may cause increased inflammation and eventual neoplasia.

Moreover, macrophages infiltrating the tumor microenvironment can transition towards a regulatory phenotype. Regulatory macrophages produce Interleukin 10, which can inhibit cytotoxic responses of other lymphocytes to cancer cell antigens. The stromal reaction surrounding a tumor, as well as prostaglandins and hypoxia may play a role in this transition.

Epithelial-mesenchymal transition has been found to be influenced by all types of macrophages, which cause both pro and anti-inflammatory responses that can promote EMT.

== Non-cytokine examples of macrophage-activating factors ==
Pathogenic antigens can bind to toll-like receptors that stimulate macrophage activation and response. Examples include heat shock proteins released during apoptosis, and bacterial lipopolysaccharide.

== Examples ==
- Interferon-gamma
- Interleukin 4
- TNF alpha
- CD36

== Miscellaneous ==
It has been suggested that MAF can be formed by probiotic bacteria in a yoghurt medium. This probiotic mixture has been found to be helpful in various immune disturbances including ME/CFS.
