= Papulonecrotic tuberculid =

- Specialty: Infectious diseases

Papulonecrotic tuberculid is usually an asymptomatic, chronic skin disorder, presenting in successive eruptions of skin lesions symmetrically distributed on the extensor extremities and other surfaces of the body.

== See also ==
- Tuberculid
- List of cutaneous conditions
