= Charles Mantoux =

French physician

- Born: May 14, 1877; Paris
- Died: May 3, 1947; Le Cannet
- Education: University of Paris
- Known for: Mantoux test

Charles Mantoux (French: [mɑ̃tu]; May 14, 1877, Paris – May 3, 1947, Le Cannet) was a French physician and the developer of the eponymous serological test for tuberculosis.

== Biography ==
Mantoux graduated from the University of Paris, where he studied under Broca. For health reasons, he relocated to Cannes but continued to work in Paris during the long vacation periods granted to patients in sanatoriums.

In 1908, he presented his first study of intradermal injections to the French Academy of Sciences and published this work in 1910. In the following years, the intradermal test replaced the subcutaneous test (Pirquet test). Mantoux completed this research and made other contributions to public health and radiology without any affiliation with major universities and institutions.

== Works ==
- La syphilis Nerveuse Latente et les Stigmates Nerveux de la Syphilis. Paris, 1904.

== See also ==
- Mantoux test

== Sources ==
- B. G. Firkin & J. A. Whitworth (1987). Dictionary of Medical Eponyms. Parthenon Publishing. ISBN 1-85070-333-7
