= Tuberculin =

Extract used to identify a tuberculosis infection

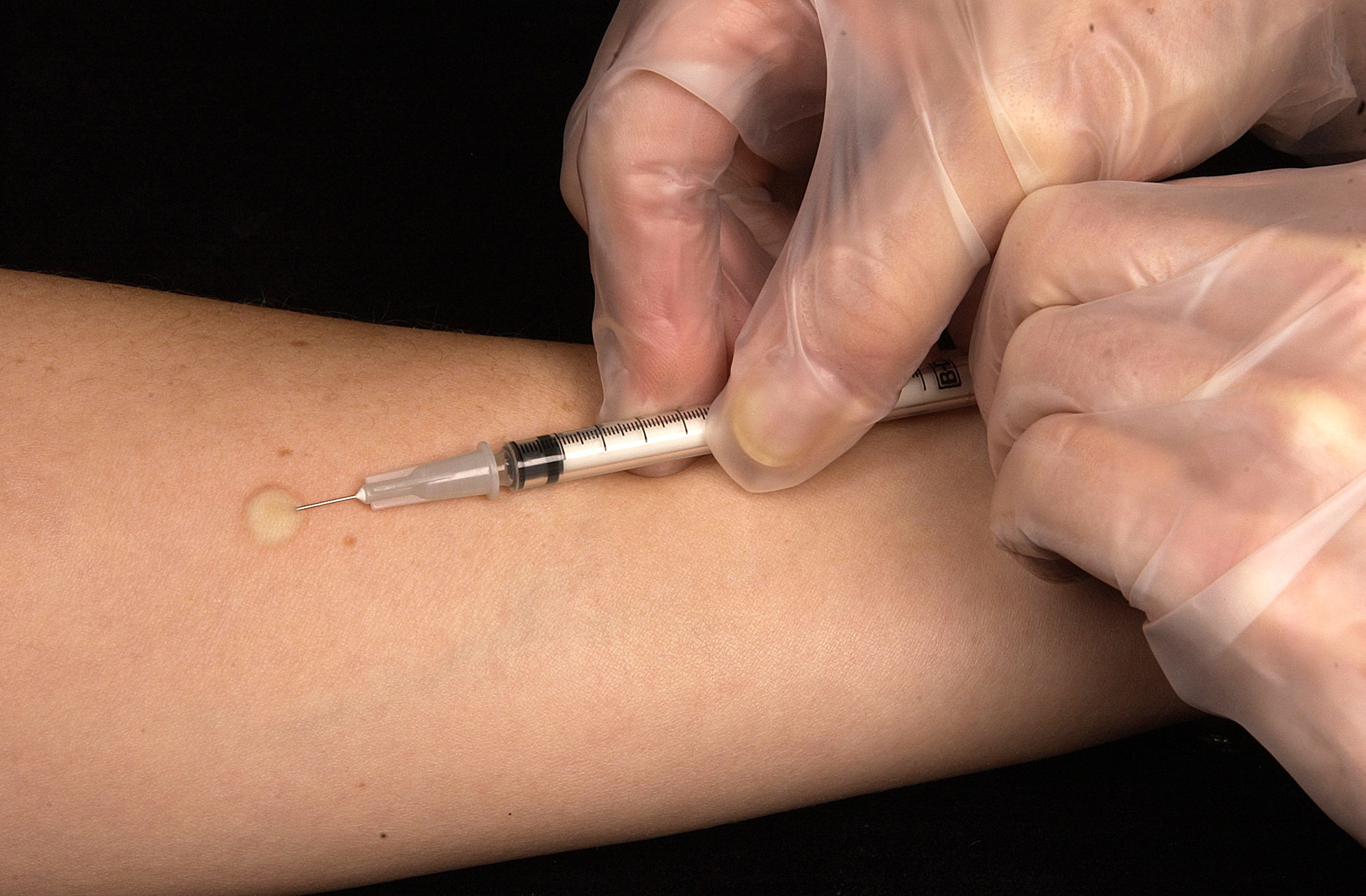

Clinical data
- Trade names: Aplisol, Mantoux, PPD, others
- AHFS/Drugs.com: Monograph
- Routes of administration: intradermal
- ATC code: V04CF01 (WHO)

Legal status
- Legal status: US: ℞-only

Identifiers
- CAS Number: 92129-86-7
- DrugBank: DB11601
- ChemSpider: none
- UNII: I7L8FKN87J

Tuberculin, known in its modern form as purified protein derivative (PPD), is a combination of proteins that are used in the diagnosis of tuberculosis by injection into the skin. Common side effects include redness, itchiness (pruritus), and pain at the site of injection. Allergic reactions may occasionally occur. Use is safe in pregnancy.

The original tuberculin, a glycerin extract of Mycobacterium tuberculosis, was discovered in 1890 by Robert Koch. Koch, best known for his work on the etiology (cause, origin) of tuberculosis (TB), laid down various rigorous guidelines that aided the establishment between a pathogen and the specific disease that followed that were later named Koch's postulates. Although he initially believed it would cure tuberculosis, this was later disproved. PPD was invented in 1934 by Florence B. Seibert, greatly improving the reliability of the skin test over Koch's extract.

PPD is on the World Health Organization's List of Essential Medicines.

== Medical uses ==
Tuberculin/PPD is injected into the skin for the tuberculin skin test. After some time the amount of swelling is measured to determine the immune system's current level of activity against tuberculosis. A high level of swelling is considered proof for tuberculosis infection. The currently globally accepted method is the Mantoux test, named after French physician Charles Mantoux who pioneered using such a test in 1907. However, this test was not reliable enough until the replacement of crude tuberculin by PPD in the 1940s.

In the Mantoux test, the swelling is measured after 48 to 72 hours. If the area has a diameter more than a five to ten millimeters of swelling, the test is considered positive. Reliable administration of the skin test requires large amounts of training, supervision, and practice. The test may be falsely positive in those who have been previously vaccinated with BCG or have been infected by other types of mycobacteria. The test may be falsely negative within ten weeks of infection, in those less than six months old, and in those who have been infected for many years.

Alternative skin test methods include:

- The tine test, which uses a "button" with four to six short needles coated with tuberculin instead of an injection. It is easier to administer. It has comparable results if "doubtful" indications are treated as positive. The US CDC and the American Thoracic Society believe that it is less reliable because the amount of tuberculin that enters the skin cannot be accurately determined, despite the aforementioned results.
- The Heaf test, a test similar to the tine test formerly used in the United Kingdom. A spring-loaded instrument with six needles is used. It stopped being used in 2005 as the manufacturer deemed the production of this instrument financially unsustainable.

== Standardization ==
Purified protein derivative (PPD) tuberculin is a precipitate of non-species-specific molecules obtained from filtrates of sterilized, concentrated cultures. A number of "standards" were established to compare the potency of different batches of PPD, so they can be measured in a unit of activity called the international unit (IU) or tuberculin unit (TU). The IU is defined by a bioassay: the same number of international units should produce the same degree of reaction when used on similar animals. Because PPD is mostly used for the Mantoux test, this use is defined as intradermal injection, and its reaction the size of swelling.

The first (and current) international standard for PPD of human tuberculin was a batch created in 1939, called PPD-S. Each IU or TU is equivalent to 0.02 μg of the proteins in PPD. There has a constant fear of PPD-S stocks eventually running out, so many alternative standards have been made and calibrated against the PPD-S, including PPD-S2 (current US standard), RT 23 (current WHO recommendation for skin test), etc.

Besides PPD from human tuberculin (from M. tuberculosis), bovine (M. bovis) and avian (M. avian) PPDs have also been made for testing against other species of Mycobacteria.

PPD consists of hundreds of different proteins from the tuberculosis bacterium and the bioassay method does not cover all the differences between batches. Products calibrated to the same "strength" on the same standard can still show slight differences in how they produce reactions in people receiving the test. It has also been argued that calibration results from single-point injection would not translate to multiple-puncture techniques such as tine and Heaf tests and a separate calibration should be done for the multiple-puncture method.

== History ==
=== Hope for a cure ===
Tuberculin was invented by German scientist and physician Robert Koch in 1890. The original tuberculin was a glycerine extract of the tubercle bacilli and was developed as a remedy for tuberculosis. This was originally considered a cure for tuberculosis, given to patients in subcutaneous doses of a brownish, transparent liquid that was gathered through cultured filtrates. However, the treatment did not result in the anticipated reduction of deaths.

When the tuberculin treatment was first given to patients in 1891, a febrile reaction that lasted between four and five hours was recorded in most patients. The symptoms of these reactions included a fever that was accompanied by vomiting, rigors, or other forms of constitutional symptoms. After these symptoms became recurring in patients, Koch had noted how increasing dosages of the treatment over time resulted in quicker and more effective healing in the mild cases of tuberculosis, along with the more serious cases where progression was slower, yet still progressive.

British efforts to set up "dispensaries" for the examination, diagnosis and treatment of poor citizens achieved better results, as the protocol of the Edinburgh System encompassed treatment of the homes and all contacts of the patients with TB. As an example, Dr Hilda Clark's dispensary at Street, Somerset was especially noted for its efficacious treatment of the less severe cases.

Clemens von Pirquet, an Austrian physician, discovered that patients who had previously received injections of horse serum or smallpox vaccine had quicker, more severe reactions to a second injection, and he coined the word allergy to describe this hypersensitivity reaction. Soon after, he discovered that the same type of reaction took place in those infected with tuberculosis. His observations led to the development of the tuberculin skin test. Individuals with active tuberculosis were usually tuberculin positive, but many of those with disseminated and rapidly progressive disease were negative. This led to the widespread but erroneous belief that tuberculin reactivity is an indicator of immunity to tuberculosis.

==== Effectiveness proclaimed ====
In Koch's time, close to one in seven Germans died of tuberculosis. For that reason, the public reacted euphorically to the discovery of the pathogen since it sparked hope for a cure. Until that time, the only effective remedy for an infectious disease was quinine, which was used to treat malaria.

At the Tenth International Medical Congress held in 1890 in Berlin, Koch unexpectedly introduced a cure for tuberculosis, which he called tuberculin. He did not reveal its composition, which was not unusual as it was not then customary to patent medicine, Phenazone being the only exception. The public trusted the famous physician and reacted enthusiastically. Koch was awarded the Grand Cross of the Order of the Red Eagle.

The social hygienist Alfred Grotjahn described the arrival of tuberculin in Greifswald: "Finally the great day also arrived for Greifswald on which the Clinic for Internal Medicine was to carry out the first inoculations with tuberculin. It was celebrated like the laying of a foundation stone or the unveiling of a monument. Doctors, nurses and patients dressed in snowy white and the director, garbed in a black frock coat, stood out against a background of laurel trees: ceremonial address by the internist, execution of the vaccination on selected patients, a thunderous cheer for Robert Koch!"

Koch attempted to profit from his discovery, which was held against him since he had conducted his research at a public institution using public money. He demanded that the Ministry of Culture finance an institute to be used exclusively for tuberculin production, and estimated the annual profit at 4.5 million marks. Koch also hinted that he had received offers from the US. At the time, regulations for testing medicines did not yet exist. According to Koch, he had tested tuberculin on animals, but he was unable to produce the guinea pigs which had allegedly been cured. He seemed unconcerned by the evidence that humans had a more dramatic reaction to tuberculin versus his laboratory animals, exhibiting fever, pains in their joints, and nausea. In addition to other test subjects, he tested tuberculin on Hedwig Freiberg (his mistress and later wife), who was 16 years old at the time. She relates in her memoirs that Koch had told her that she could "possibly get quite sick" but that she was "not likely to die".

==== Ineffectiveness as a cure ====
In February 1891, a medical trial was performed on 1769 patients to whom tuberculin was administered, and the results made clear that it was not a true cure. Tuberculin failed to provide any form of protective action as only 1% of people in the trial were cured, 34% of people showed only a slight amount of improvement, 55% of the patients showed little to no change in their health, and 4% died due to the treatment having no effect.

After tuberculin was on the market, articles reporting successful treatments appeared in professional publications and the public media, only to be followed by the first reports of deaths. At first, the negative reports were not viewed with alarm, as the doctors were, after all, experimenting on seriously ill patients.

After performing autopsies on the corpses, Rudolf Virchow proved that not only did tuberculin not kill the bacteria, it even activated latent bacteria. When Robert Koch was forced to reveal the composition of his "secret cure", it was discovered that he himself did not precisely know what it contained. Before tuberculin was released to the public, Koch had initially tested the treatment on himself to determine its toxicity to the human body, which is no longer considered a reliable or acceptable method for establishing drug safety. It was an extract of tuberculosis pathogens in glycerine, and the presence of the dead pathogens themselves could also be confirmed.

Koch asked the Prussian Minister of Culture for time off and went to Egypt, which was interpreted as an attempt to escape from the German public. A heated debate took place in the Prussian parliament in May 1891. Koch remained convinced of the value of his cure. In 1897, he presented a modified form of tuberculin, which was also ineffective as a therapeutic agent. This presentation, and numerous other indications, suggest that he did not intend to commit a "tuberculin scam" (a common accusation), but that he had deluded himself.

==== Historical perspective and legacy ====
The medical historian Christoph Gradmann has reconstructed Koch's beliefs regarding the function of tuberculin: the medicine did not kill the bacteria but rather initiated a necrosis of the tubercular tissue, thus "starving" the tuberculosis pathogen. This idea was then outside customary medical theories, as it remains today.

The tuberculin scandal was understood as a cautionary tale in regards to testing medicine. Emil von Behring's introduction of his diphtheria antitoxin in 1893 had been preceded by lengthy clinical testing, and the serum was only slowly introduced into practical use, accompanied by a critical discussion among qualified experts. Paul Ehrlich also proceeded with conspicuous caution in 1909 when introducing the first synthetically produced chemotherapeutic agent, Salvarsan, as a cure for an infectious disease, syphilis.

=== Testing agent ===
In 1907, Clemens von Pirquet further developed tuberculin as a testing agent for diagnosing tuberculosis, but this was his own achievement, independent of any of Robert Koch's ideas. The company Meister Lucius & Brüning AG (later Hoechst AG) in Frankfurt/Höchst purchased the large leftover stocks of tuberculin and the company later began production under the leadership of Koch's student Arnold Libbertz.

When Koch first discovered and released the testing process for tuberculosis, there was no realization of how widely this type of diagnostic test would be used. With the various clinical trials and observations made through the differing responses to tuberculin in patients with and without tuberculosis, new methods that corresponded to the backbone of this treatment began to arise. The continued use of new methods that further eliminated systemic symptoms that were caused by a local reaction at the injection site allowed for other medical advances. These included the Pirquet cutaneous test, the Moro percutaneous path test, the Mantoux intracutaneous test, and the Calmette conjunctival test.

With experience gained from the tuberculin skin test during the greater part of the last century, the current body of medical knowledge and advances were made possible by Robert Koch. Through the failures and successes of tuberculin, more than ever before is known about the causes and symptoms of tuberculosis and the measures to prevent it. In addition, the discovery of the tuberculin skin test paved the way to the world's understanding of many other mycobacterial infections as well as certain fungal infections. Coupled with that, there has been more profound research and discoveries on the immune systems of humans and animals as the idea of skin testing broadened. The in-depth understanding of diagnostic tests was not present until the tuberculin skin test was discovered.
