= CUSP9 =

CUSP9 (Coordinated Undermining of Survival Paths) is one of several cancer treatment protocols using repurposed older drugs to interfere with cancer cell's growth signaling rather than directly killing them with cytotoxic drugs. CUSP9 is a treatment specifically targeted to glioblastoma that adds to a traditional cancer cell killing drug, temozolomide, nine older, non-cytotoxic drugs to block growth factors that enhance or drive glioblastoma growth — aprepitant blocks NK-1, auranofin inhibits thioredoxin reductase, captopril inhibits angiotensin converting enzyme, celecoxib blocks cyclooxygenase-2, disulfiram blocks aldehyde dehydrogenase, itraconazole blocks Hedgehog signaling, minocycline inhibits metalloproteinase-2 and -9, quetiapine inhibits RANKL, sertraline inhibits translation-controlled tumor protein [TCTP]. These targets have been shown to be active in promoting glioblastoma growth.

The current version, CUSP9v3, uses continuous daily very low dose temozolomide with aprepitant, auranofin, captopril, celecoxib, disulfiram, itraconazole, minocycline, ritonavir and sertraline. Of these, an exhaustive study in 2024 showed particularly strong in vitro glioblastoma cell growth inhibition by auranofin, disulfiram, itraconazole, sertraline. An in vitro study in 2024 showed synergy between the "Tumor Treating Field" Optune device and the CUSP9v3 medicines.

Multidrug approaches like CUSP9 may be required to target the different aspects or attributes of the common deadly cancers, including glioblastoma.

Some attributes of glioblastoma that require a multi-drug approach are:

1. Spatial and temporal heterogeneity of growth-driving dependencies
2. Existence of mutually supporting, bilaterally communicating cell communities
3. Compensatory tumor responses to treatments
4. Existence of multiple cross-covering, growth-driving signaling pathways functioning in parallel
5. Metabolic flexibility reliance shifted to another energy source if one becomes inhibited
6. Pathological engagement of multiple normally functioning body systems to facilitate growth (e.g., cytokines, trophic factors, innervation, interacting stroma, angiogenesis)
7. A subset of tumor stem cells with the potential to enter dormancy
8. An inverse relationship often seen between growth and invasion, where inhibiting one enhances the other

Combinations of drugs to treat glioblastoma are commonly based on empirical, non-hypothesis driven data. CUSP9 is related several other trials using similar repurposed multidrug conceptual approach: The COMBAT regimen for treating various advanced pediatric cancers that uses two re-purposed non-cytotoxic drugs to augment two traditional cytotoxic drugs, or the GLAD regimen that uses one traditional anti-cancer drug, gefitinib, with three re-purposed non-cancer drugs. Or the MEMMAT regimen, in a current trial of A.Peyrl et al. using a 7 drug cocktail, (ClinicalTrials.gov Identifier: NCT01356290)- non-cytotoxic drugs bevacizumab, thalidomide, celecoxib, and fenofibric acid to augment traditional cytotoxic drugs etoposide, cyclophosphamide, and cytarabine to treat progressive medulloblastoma. The MDACT regimen for glioblastoma, cholangiocarcinoma or non-small cell lung cancer celecoxib, dapsone, disulfiram, itraconazole, pyrimethamine, and telmisartan [13]. The CLOVA Regimen uses cimetidine, lithium, olanzapine, and valproate with temozolomide in treating glioblastoma. A regimen related to CUSP9v3 called AVRO has been proposed as a simpler regimen. AVRO uses aprepitant, vortioxetine, roflumilast and olanzapine. In common with CUSP9v3, aprepitant and an SSRI antidepressant related to sertraline, vortioxetine, are used in AVRO.

The ReDO project and many others also follow this line of thought as in CUSP9, repurposing older drugs for their anti-cancer effect with simultaneous use of several of them, in cancer treatment. The drug repurposing movement uses the central or ancillary attributes of a drug normally used for non-cancer indications but that may constructively interact with a cancer's growth mechanisms to slow that cancer's growth.

None of these treatment regimens have been proven to be safe or effective in human cancers but are occasionally tried on compassionate-use basis in patients who have exhausted all other options.

Five in vitro studies confirmed strong cytotoxicity of CUSP9 to a panel of glioblastoma cells.

== Clinical use ==
Results of a phase 1 clinical trial of CUSP9v3 [NCT02770378] was reported in June 2021. Although sample size was too small for statistically meaningful inferences of effectiveness, 30% remained alive and overtly disease free at 4+ years warranting a planned follow up phase 2-3 trial of CUSP9v3.
