= Tree-in-bud sign =

Pattern seen in radiologic examinations

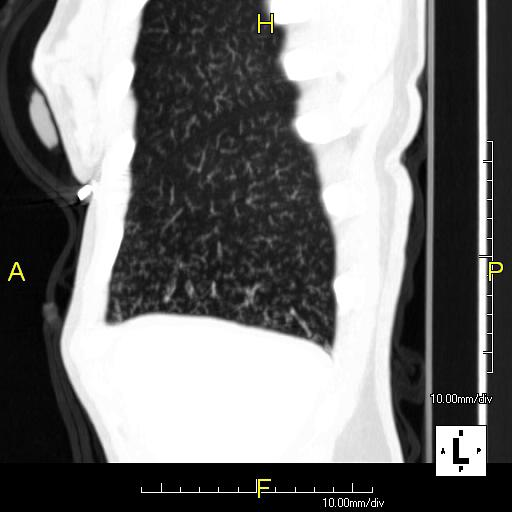
- Sagittal reformatted CT image showing "tree in bud" appearance of impacted distal small airways in primary ciliary dyskinesia
- Differential diagnosis: airway obstruction

In radiology, the tree-in-bud sign is a finding on a CT scan that indicates some degree of airway obstruction. The tree-in-bud sign is a nonspecific imaging finding that implies impaction within bronchioles, the smallest airway passages in the lung. The differential for this finding includes malignant and inflammatory etiologies, either infectious or sterile. This includes fungal infections, mycobacterial infections such as tuberculosis or mycobacterium avium intracellulare, bronchopneumonia, chronic aspiration pneumonia, cystic fibrosis or cellular impaction from bronchovascular spread of malignancy, as can occur with breast cancer, leukemia or lymphoma. It also includes lung manifestations of autoimmune diseases such as Sjögren syndrome or rheumatoid arthritis.

Histopathologic studies have shown that the tree-in-bud pattern is caused by demarcation of the normally invisible branching course of the peripheral airways, which usually results from bronchioles being plugged or blocked with mucus, pus or fluid. In addition, dilated and thickened walls of the peripheral airways and peribronchitis can make the affected bronchioles more easily visible, as is seen in patients with cystic fibrosis.
