= Extrapulmonary tuberculosis =

Tuberculosis which spreads beyond the lungs

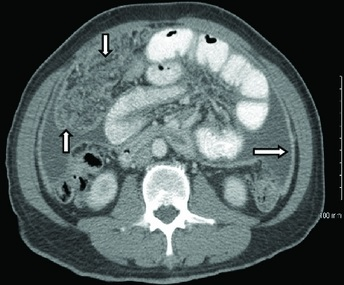
CT scan of peritoneal tuberculosis, with thickened omentum and peritoneal surfaces

Extrapulmonary tuberculosis is tuberculosis (TB) within a location in the body other than the lungs. It accounts for an increasing fraction of active cases, from 20 to 40% according to published reports, and causes other kinds of TB. These are collectively denoted as "extrapulmonary tuberculosis". Extrapulmonary TB occurs more commonly in immunosuppressed persons and young children. In those with HIV, this occurs in more than 50% of cases. Notable extrapulmonary infection sites include the pleura (in tuberculous pleurisy), the central nervous system (in tuberculous meningitis), the lymphatic system (in scrofula of the neck), the genitourinary system (in urogenital tuberculosis), and the bones and joints (in Pott disease of the spine), among others.

Infection of the lymph nodes, known as tubercular lymphadenitis, is the most common extrapulmonary form of tuberculosis. An ulcer originating from nearby infected lymph nodes may occur and is painless. It typically enlarges slowly and has an appearance of "wash leather".

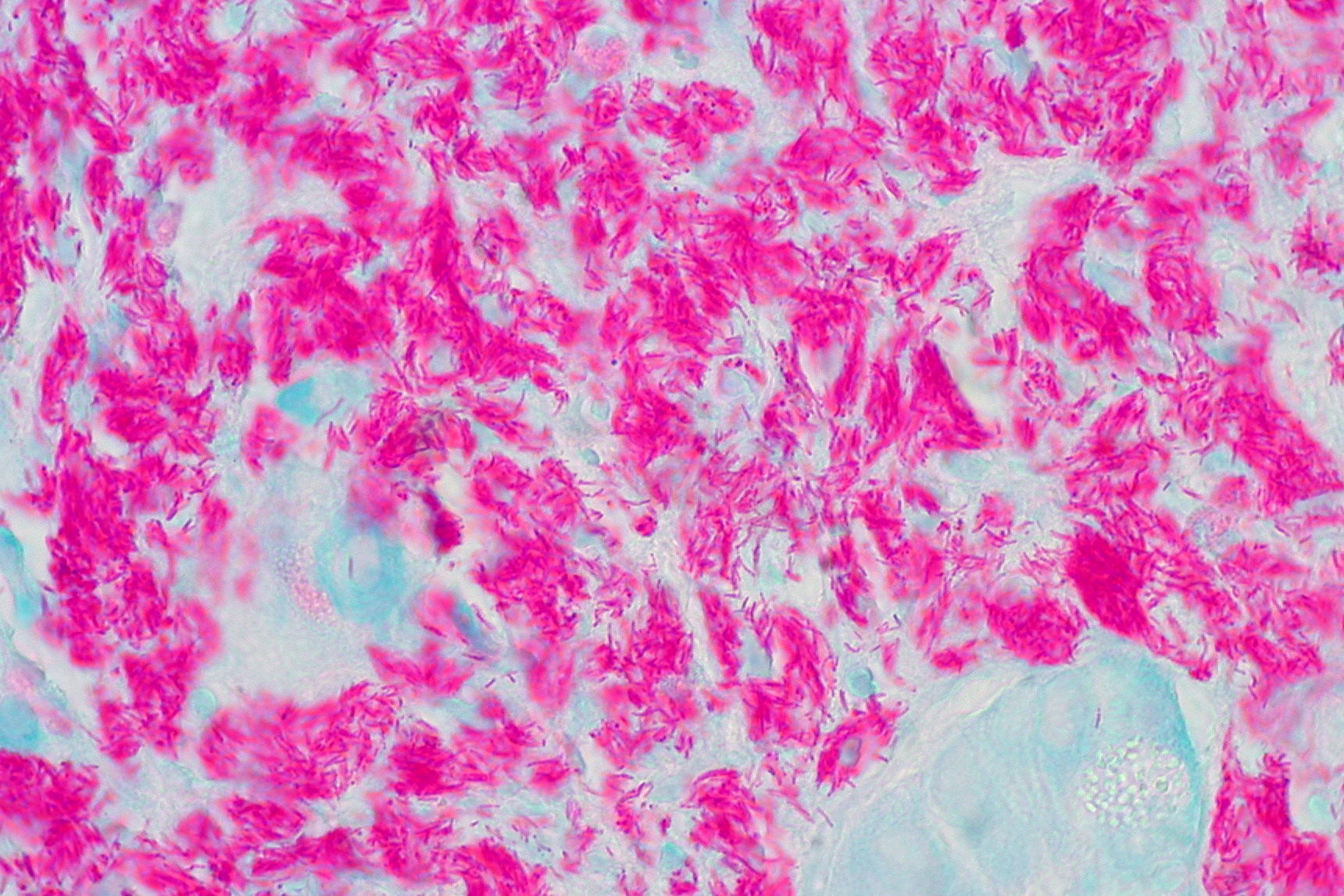
Histopathological specimen showing tuberculosis of the duodenum. Lamina propria is stuffed with wall-to-wall histiocytes. This Kinyoun carbolfuchsin stain shows innumerable acid-fast bacilli.

When it spreads to the bones, it is known as skeletal tuberculosis, a form of osteomyelitis. Tuberculosis has been present in humans since ancient times.

Central nervous system infections include tuberculous meningitis, intracranial tuberculomas, and spinal tuberculous arachnoiditis.

== Gastrointestinal ==
Abdominal infections include gastrointestinal tuberculosis (which is important to distinguish from Crohn's disease, since immunosuppressive therapy used for the latter can lead to dissemination), tuberculous peritonitis, and genitourinary tuberculosis.

A potentially more serious, widespread form of TB is called "disseminated tuberculosis", also known as miliary tuberculosis. Miliary TB currently makes up about 10% of extrapulmonary cases.

== Urogenital ==
Urogenital tuberculosis represents the second most frequent form of extrapulmonary tuberculosis, accounting for 30-40% of cases. Primarily affecting males in their fourth and fifth decades, decades after initial infection and pulmonary manifestations, the disease reactivates from bacteria colonizing the kidneys, prostate, and/or epididymis, with subsequent descending infection through the renal collecting system. The insidious progression typically produces symptoms only at advanced stages, and is frequently misdiagnosed as a common UTI, leading to diagnostic delay and organ destruction. Key clinical presentations include storage symptoms (frequency, nocturia, urgency) in 50.5% of cases, hematuria (35.6%), lumbar or flank pain (34.4%), and scrotal abnormalities (48.9% of males). Diagnosis requires culture or PCR detection of Mycobacterium tuberculosis in urine, supplemented by imaging studies showing characteristic findings such as calyceal irregularities, renal infundibular stenosis, and multiple ureteral strictures. If untreated, the condition can progress from unilateral renal involvement to fibrotic bladder damage with contraction, and potentially bilateral kidney involvement through vesicoureteral reflux, culminating in end-stage renal failure.

== Pleural effusion ==
This condition is one of the common forms of extrapulmonary tuberculosis. It occurs during acute phases of the disease, with fever, cough, and pain while breathing (pleurisy). Pleural fluid usually contains mainly lymphocytes and the Mycobacterium bacteria. Gold standard of diagnosis is the detection of Mycobacterium in pleural fluid. Other diagnostic tests include the detection of adenosine deaminase (above 40 U/L) and interferon gamma in pleural fluid.
