= Mantoux test =

Immunological test for tuberculosis

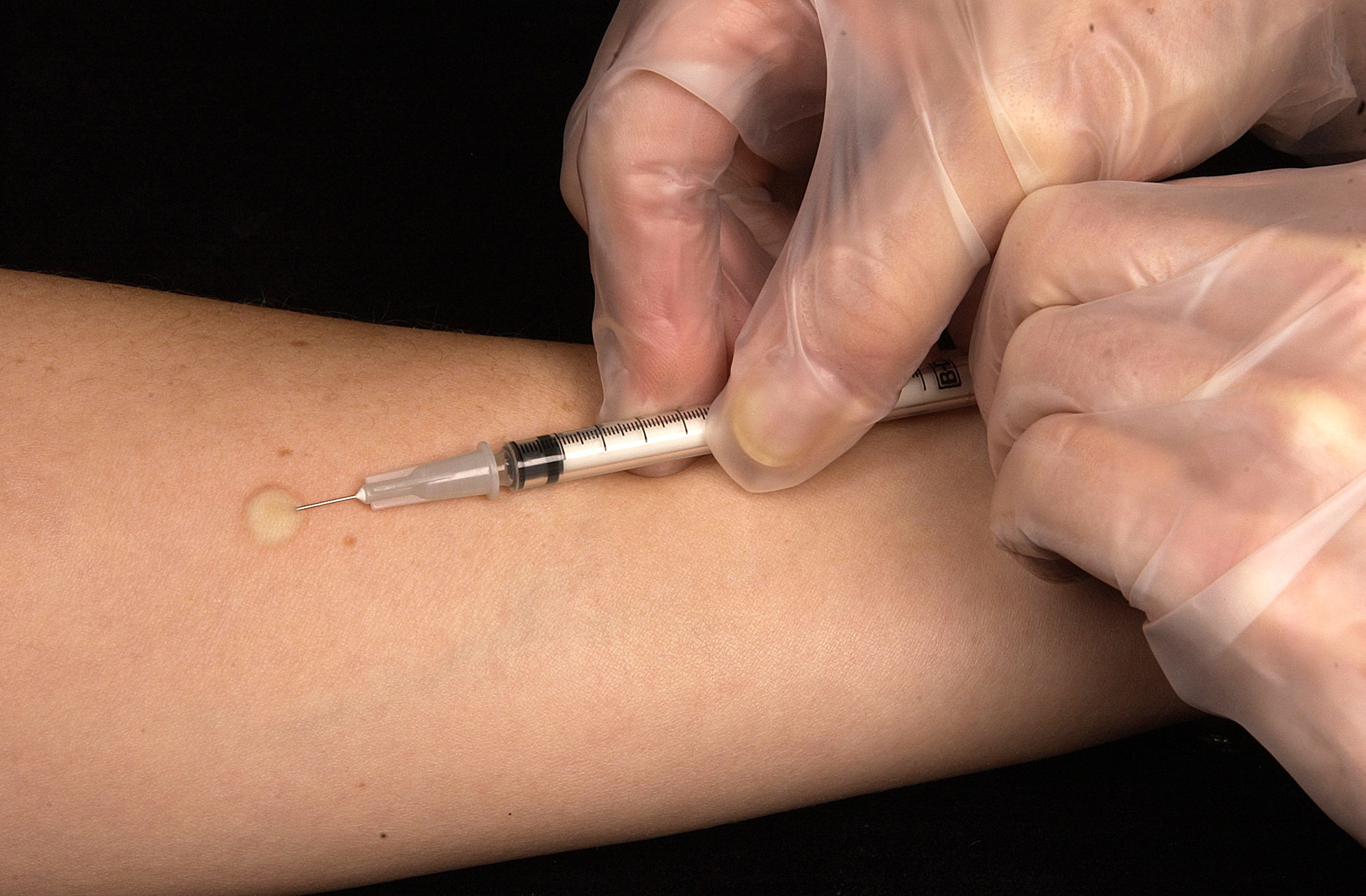
- The Mantoux skin test consists of an intradermal injection of one-tenth of a milliliter (ml) of PPD tuberculin. The circular shape is known as a wheal response.
- Synonyms: Mantoux screening test
- Purpose: Screen for tuberculosis

The Mantoux test (also called the Mendel–Mantoux test, tuberculin skin test (TST), or PPD test) is a method used to screen for tuberculosis (TB) infection. It has largely replaced older skin testing techniques such as the tine and Heaf tests. The test involves injecting a small amount of purified protein derivative (PPD) tuberculin just under the skin of the forearm. If performed correctly, the injection creates a small, pale bump called a wheal. The test site is examined a few days later for swelling or hardening of the skin, an immune response that would be expected if the person had been exposed to tuberculosis. However, additional tests are usually required to confirm active infection.

== History ==
The share of tuberculosis tests that are positive

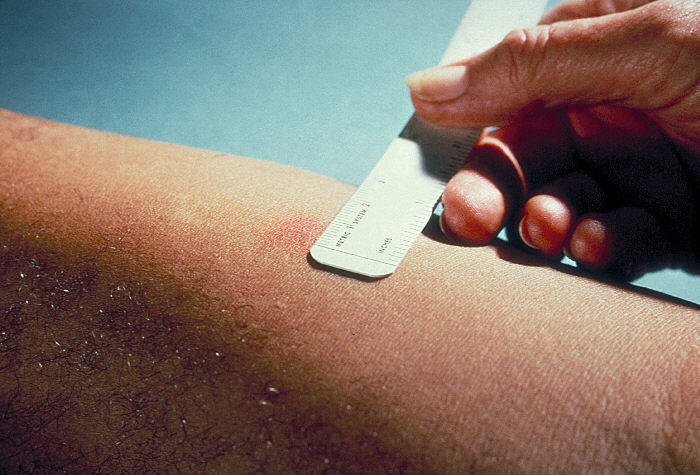
The size of induration is measured 48–72 hours later. Erythema (redness) should not be measured.

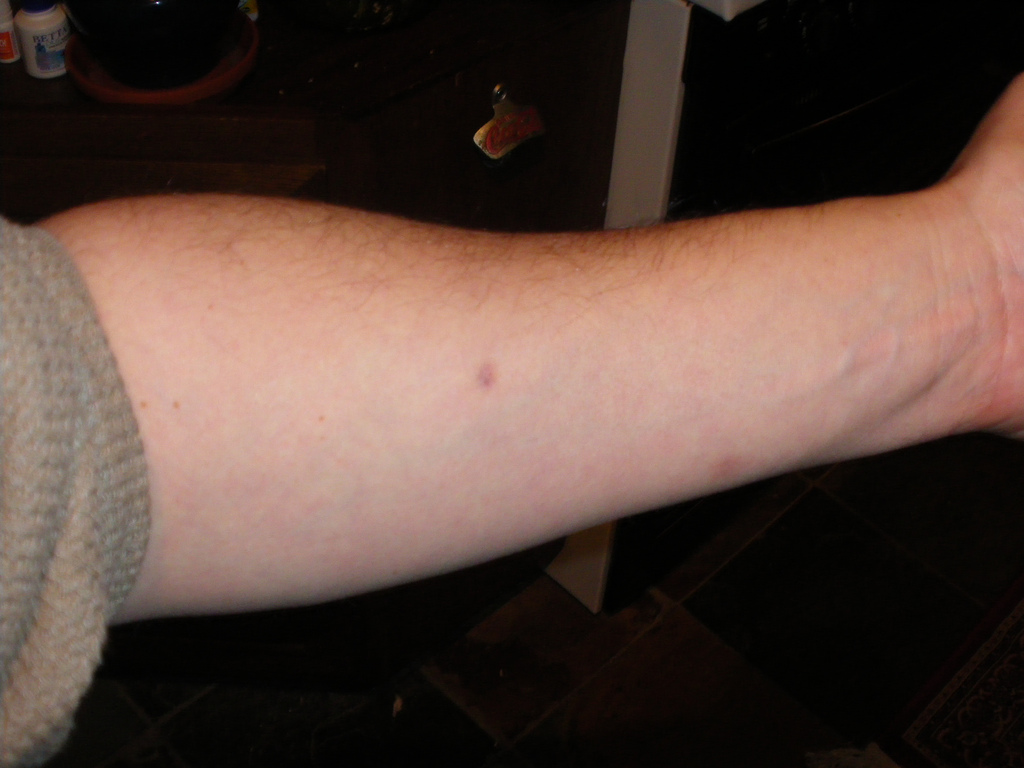
Mantoux test injection site in a subject without chronic conditions or in a high-risk group clinically diagnosed as negative at 50 hours

Tuberculin is a glycerol extract of the tubercle bacillus. Purified protein derivative (PPD) tuberculin is a precipitate of species-nonspecific molecules obtained from filtrates of sterilized, concentrated cultures. The tuberculin reaction was first described by Robert Koch in 1890. The test was first developed and described by the German physician Felix Mendel in 1908. It is named after Charles Mantoux, a French physician who built on the work of Koch and Clemens von Pirquet to create his test in 1907. However, the test was unreliable due to impurities in tuberculin which tended to cause false results.

Esmond R. Long and Florence B. Seibert identified the active agent in tuberculin as a protein. Seibert then spent a number of years developing methods for separating and purifying the protein from Mycobacterium tuberculosis, obtaining purified protein derivative (PPD) and enabling the creation of a reliable test for tuberculosis. Her first publication on the purification of tuberculin appeared in 1934. By the 1940s, Seibert's PPD was the international standard for tuberculin tests. In 1939, Russian M.A. Linnikova created a modified version of PPD. In 1954, the Soviet Union started mass production of PPD-L, named after Linnikova.

== Procedure ==
In the Mantoux test, a standard dose of tuberculin is injected intradermally (into the dermis, just beneath the outer layer of skin) on the forearm using a small syringe. The standard dose specified by the U.S. Centers for Disease Control and Prevention is 5 tuberculin units (TU) in 0.1 ml of solution, while the U.K. National Health Service specifies 2 TU in the same volume. The injection is given with the needle bevel facing upward, producing a small, pale, raised bump (called a wheal) about 6 to 10 mm in diameter if placed correctly. The test site is then examined 48–96 hours later—ideally at 72 hours—and the result is recorded based on the size of the reaction.

The reaction occurs because a person previously exposed to Mycobacterium tuberculosis is expected to mount an immune response to the injected proteins. This is a classic example of a delayed-type hypersensitivity (type IV) reaction, in which T cells and other immune cells gather at the site over 24 to 72 hours, producing localized inflammation. The response is measured by the diameter of induration (a firm, raised area of skin), recorded in millimeters across the forearm. Redness (erythema) is not measured. A result with no induration is recorded as "0 mm."

Earlier versions of the test, such as the Pirquet test, applied tuberculin to the skin through a shallow scratch (scarification).

== Classification of tuberculin reaction ==
The results of this test must be interpreted carefully. The person's medical risk factors determine at which increment (5 mm, 10 mm, or 15 mm) of induration the result is considered positive. A positive result indicates TB exposure.

- 5 mm or more is positive in
  - An HIV-positive person
  - Persons with recent contacts with a TB patient
  - Persons with nodular or fibrotic changes on chest X-ray consistent with old healed TB
  - Patients with organ transplants, and other immunosuppressed patients
- 10 mm or more is positive in
  - Recent arrivals (less than five years) from high-prevalence countries
  - Injection drug users
  - Residents and employees of high-risk congregate settings (e.g., prisons, nursing homes, hospitals, homeless shelters, etc.)
  - Mycobacteriology lab personnel
  - Persons with clinical conditions that place them at high risk (e.g., diabetes, prolonged corticosteroid therapy, leukemia, end-stage renal disease, chronic malabsorption syndromes, low body weight, etc.)
  - Children less than four years of age, or children and adolescents exposed to adults in high-risk categories
- 15 mm or more is positive in
  - Persons with no known risk factors for TB

A tuberculin test conversion is defined as an increase of 10 mm or more within a two-year period, regardless of age. Alternative criteria include increases of 6, 12, 15 or 18 mm.

=== Interpretation process ===
According to the guidelines published by Centers for Disease Control and Prevention in 2005, the results are re-categorized into 3 parts based on their previous or baseline outcomes:

- Baseline test: ≥10 mm is positive (either first or second step); 0 to 9 mm is negative
- Serial testing without known exposure: Increase of ≥10 mm is positive
- Known exposure:
  - ≥5 mm is positive in patients with baseline of 0 mm
  - ≥10 mm is positive in patients with negative baseline or previous screening result of >0 mm

== False positive result ==
TST (tuberculin skin test) positive is measured by size of induration. The size of the induration considered to be a positive result depends on risk factors. For example, a low-risk patient must have a larger induration for a positive result than a high-risk patient. High-risk groups include recent contacts, those with HIV, those with chest radiograph with fibrotic changes, organ transplant recipients, and those with immunosuppression.

Due to the test's low specificity, most positive reactions in low-risk individuals are false positives. A false positive result may be caused by nontuberculous mycobacteria or previous administration of BCG vaccine. Vaccination with BCG may result in a false-positive result for many years after vaccination.

False positives can also occur when the injected area is touched, causing swelling and itching. If the swelling is less than 5 mm, it is possibly due to error by the healthcare personnel causing inflammation to the area.

Another source of false positive results can be allergic reaction or hypersensitivity. Although rare (about 0.08 reported reactions per million doses of tuberculin), these reactions can be dangerous and precautions should be taken by having epinephrin available.

=== BCG vaccine and the Mantoux test ===
The role of Mantoux testing in people who have been vaccinated is disputed. The US recommends that tuberculin skin testing is not contraindicated for BCG-vaccinated persons, and prior BCG vaccination should not influence the interpretation of the test. The UK recommends that interferon-γ testing should be used to help interpret positive Mantoux tests of over 5 mm, and repeated tuberculin skin testing must not be done in people who have had BCG vaccinations. In general, the US recommendation may result in a larger number of people being falsely diagnosed with latent tuberculosis, while the UK approach has an increased chance of missing patients with latent tuberculosis who should be treated.

According to the US guidelines, latent tuberculosis infection diagnosis and treatment is considered for any BCG-vaccinated person whose skin test is 10 mm or greater, if any of these circumstances are present:

- Was in contact with another person with infectious TB
- Was born or has lived in a high TB prevalence country
- Is continually exposed to populations where TB prevalence is high

A meta-analysis in 2014 found that the Bacillus Calmette–Guérin (BCG) vaccine reduced infections by 19–27% and reduced progression to active tuberculosis by 71%. The Ohio Department of Health states that it give 80% of children protection against tuberculous meningitis and miliary tuberculosis. Therefore, a positive TST/PPD in a person who has received BCG vaccine is interpreted as latent TB infection (LTBI).

== False negative result ==
Reaction to the PPD or tuberculin test is suppressed by the following conditions:

- Recent TB infection (less than 8–10 weeks)
- Infectious mononucleosis
- Live virus vaccine – The test should not be carried out within 3 weeks of live virus vaccination (e. g. MMR vaccine or Sabin vaccine).
- Sarcoidosis
- Hodgkin's disease
- Corticosteroid therapy/steroid use
- Malnutrition
- Immunological compromise – Those on immuno-suppressive treatment or those with HIV and low CD4 T cell counts, frequently show negative results from the PPD test.

This is because the immune system needs to be functional to mount a response to the protein derivative injected under the skin. A false negative result may occur in a person who has been recently infected with TB, but whose immune system hasn't yet reacted to the bacteria.

- Upper respiratory virus infection

In case a second tuberculin test is necessary it should be carried out in the other arm to avoid hypersensitising the skin.

=== Anergy testing ===
In cases of anergy, a lack of reaction by the body's defence mechanisms when it comes into contact with foreign substances, the tuberculin reaction will occur weakly, thus compromising the value of Mantoux testing. For example, anergy is present in AIDS, a disease which strongly depresses the immune system. Therefore, anergy testing is advised in cases where there is suspicion that anergy is present. However, routine anergy skin testing is not recommended.

== Two-step testing ==
Some people who have been infected with TB may have a negative reaction when tested years after infection, as the immune system response may gradually wane. This initial skin test, though negative, may stimulate (boost) the body's ability to react to tuberculin in future tests. Thus, a positive reaction to a subsequent test may be misinterpreted as a new infection, when in fact it is the result of the boosted reaction to an old infection.

Use of two-step testing is recommended for initial skin testing of adults who will be retested periodically (e.g., health care workers). This ensures any future positive tests can be interpreted as being caused by a new infection, rather than simply a reaction to an old infection.

- The first test is read 48–72 hours after injection.
  - If the first test is positive, consider the person infected.
  - If the first test is negative, give a second test one to three weeks after the first injection.
- The second test is read 48–72 hours after injection.
  - If the second test is positive, consider the person infected in the distant past.
  - If the second test is negative, consider the person uninfected.

A person who is diagnosed as "infected in the distant past" on two-step testing is called a "tuberculin reactor".

The US recommendation that prior BCG vaccination be ignored results in almost universal false diagnosis of tuberculosis infection in people who have had BCG (mostly foreign nationals).

== Alternatives ==
=== Other skin tests ===
The Mantoux test requires a trained hand to inject PPD into the skin. Alternative test methods such as the Heaf test and the tine test use a simplified delivery method that can be performed with less training.

The Heaf test uses a spring-loaded "gun" with 6 needles to inject 10 TU (0.1 ml at 100 TU/ml, 1:1000) of PPD. It was discontinued in 2005 because the manufacturer of the device found it financially unsustainable. The equivalent Mantoux test positive levels are:

- <5 mm induration (Heaf 0–1)
- 5–15 mm induration (Heaf 2)
- >15 mm induration (Heaf 3–4)

The tine test uses a small button with 4 to 6 needles dipped with PPD to deliver it into the skin. The US CDC and the American Thoracic Society believe that it is less reliable because the amount of tuberculin that enters the skin cannot be accurately determined. However, it actually yields comparable results if "doubtful" indications are treated as positive. Its low cost and ease of administration makes it useful for screening.

=== Other sensitizing agents ===
Bovine tuberculosis is a disease endemic among wild animals in many parts of the world, with the potential to be passed on to domestic animals. BCG vaccination is known to have good effect against bovine TB on wild animals, with phase II trials also showing promising results in cattle. However, food safety requires having a method to detect TB infection in cattle. PPD from bovine tuberculin was previously used but it cannot differentiate between infection and vaccination. This leads to the development of DIVA (Detecting Infected amongst Vaccinated Animals) skin tests. Early DIVAs were either too expensive or too insensitive, as they had to work only with antigens not found in BCG. A 2019 attempt produces a strain of BCG with three antigens deleted, so that these three antigens can be used in a DIVA test. In 2022, a new DIVA test uses a recombinant fusion protein (DST-F, ESAT-6 + CFP-10 + Rv3615c) as the antigen, allowing the regular BCG Danish strain 1331 vaccination to be differentiated from true bovine TB infection.

=== Interferon gamma release assays ===
In addition to tuberculin skin tests such as (principally) the Mantoux test, interferon gamma release assays (IGRAs) have become common in clinical use in the 2010s. In some contexts they are used instead of TSTs, whereas in other contexts TSTs and IGRAs both continue to be useful.

The QuantiFERON-TB Gold blood test measures the patient's immune reactivity to the TB bacterium, and is useful for initial and serial testing of persons with an increased risk of latent or active tuberculosis infection. Guidelines for its use were released by the CDC in December 2005. QuantiFERON-TB Gold is FDA-approved in the United States, has CE Mark approval in Europe and has been approved by the MHLW in Japan. The interferon gamma release assay is the preferred method for patients who have had immunosuppression and are about to start biological therapies.

T-SPOT.TB is another IGRA; it uses the ELISPOT method.=

== See also ==
- Latent tuberculosis
- QuantiFERON
- Geronimo (alpaca)
- Shambo
