= PTLD =

PTLD is an abbreviation that may refer to:

- PTLD (gene)
- Pseudo top-level domain, in computer network nomenclature
- Post-transplant lymphoproliferative disorder, types of lymphomas affecting transplant patients
- Post-tuberculosis lung disease
