= Phantom Plague =

2022 book about tuberculosis by Vidya Krishnan

Phantom Plague: How Tuberculosis Shaped our History
- Author: Vidya Krishnan
- Language: English
- Genre: non-fiction, health
- Published: 1 Feb 2022
- Publisher: PublicAffairs
- Pages: 288
- ISBN: 9781541768468

Phantom Plague: How Tuberculosis Shaped our History is a 2022 non-fiction book about the history of tuberculosis by health journalist Vidya Krishnan.

It covers the history of tuberculosis through the 19th, 20th, and early 21st centuries, from early understandings of the disease to modern public health and pharmaceutical interventions. The book explores how flawed philanthropy, politics, racism, and anti-science rhetoric have led to "medical apartheid".

== Production ==
Krishnan wrote Phantom Plague over seven years, therefore before and during the COVID-19 pandemic.

== Summary ==
Phantom Plague covers the history of tuberculosis covering 19th-century New York City slums to present day India. It contrasts the spread of tuberculosis through crowded urban settlements, Mumbai in particular, but also mentions affluent tuberculosis patients such as George Orwell, Franz Kafka, Eleanor Roosevelt, Frédéric Chopin, and the Brontë sisters.

The book documents early folk remedies, attempted public health measures, and the rise of scientific solutions. It mentions the work of Ignaz Semmelweis, Robert Kock, Joseph Lister, and Louis Pasteur to advance human understanding of infectious diseases. It documents the rise of germ theory, use and abuse of antibiotics and the epidemiological effects of crowded housing conditions on disease spread. It notes the World Health Organization's estimate that 25% of the world have latent tuberculosis. The book discusses the risk of drug-resistant tuberculosis and failed attempts to curtail the spread of tuberculosis.

Phantom Plague critiques authoritarian governments, the "toxic kindness" of philanthropists, anti-science rhetoric, and describes the modern context for tuberculosis patients as "medical apartheid".

Krishnan includes themes of racism, greed, and politics in Phantom Plague.

== Reception ==
Phantom Plague is described as "absolutely fascinating" by Victoria Irwin, Madhukar Pai describes the book as "urgent, riveting and fascinating".

Kirus Reviews described it as timely and significant. Scroll.in described the book as a fascinating story of human determination against tuberculosis as well as prejudice, anti-science and medical apartheid.

The New York Times describes it as "clear and compelling" and a "worthy read".
