= Bibliography of tuberculosis =

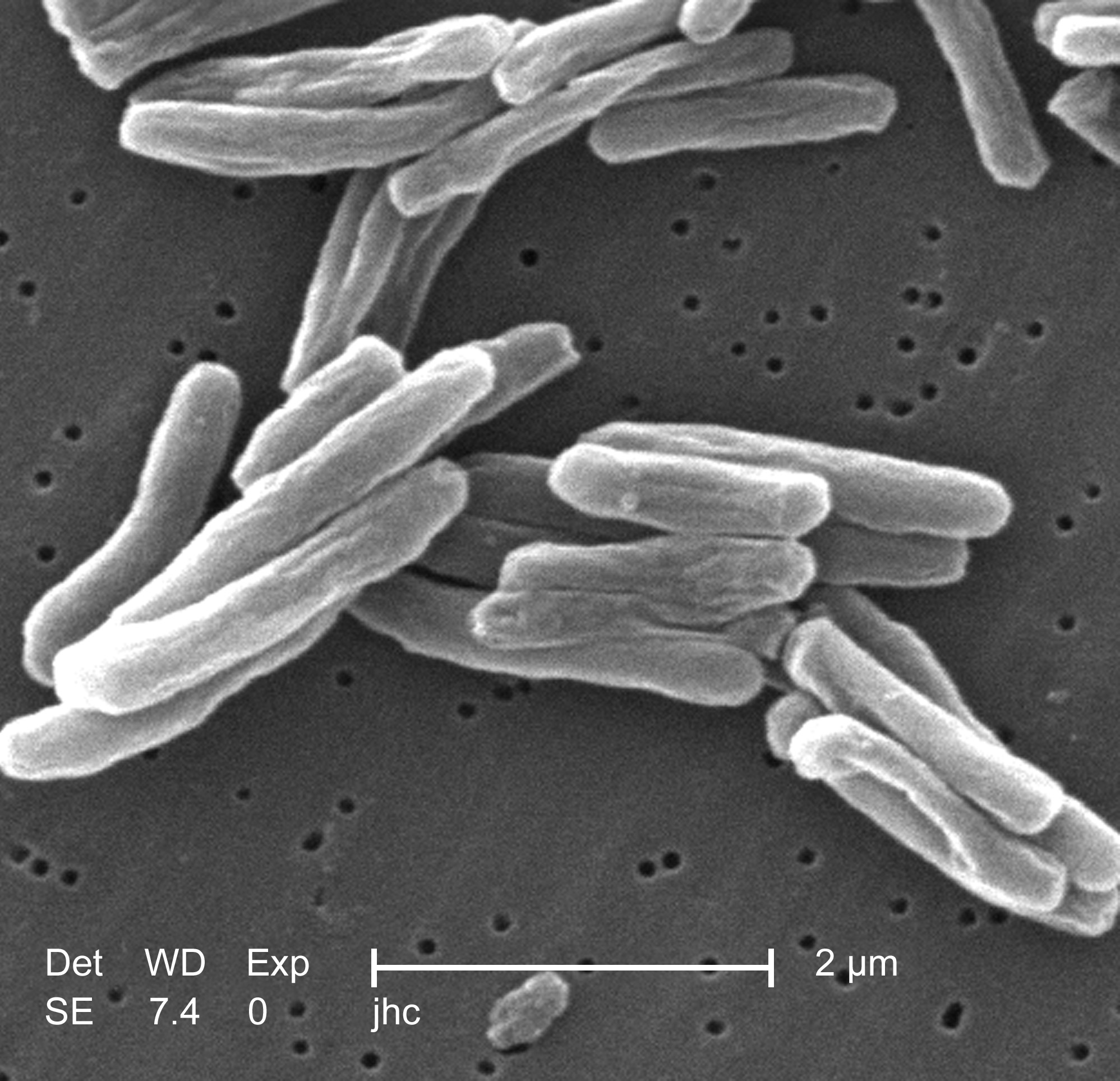
Scanning electron micrograph of M. tuberculosis

This is a bibliography of tuberculosis (TB), an infectious disease that generally affects the lungs. As of 2018, the World Health Organization estimated that 25% of the world's population was infected with the latent form of the disease. In its active form, it is one of the top 10 causes of death worldwide.

This bibliography is of non-fiction works about TB in human beings. It covers general works, key scientific papers, treatment methods and drug resistance.

== General works ==
- Bynum, Helen. (2012) Spitting Blood. Oxford University Press. ISBN 978-0199542055.
- Calwell, H. G. & D. H. Craig. (1984) The White Plague in Ulster: A short history of tuberculosis in Northern Ireland. [Belfast]: Ulster Medical Society.
- Chrétien, Jacques. (1998) Tuberculosis - the Illustrated History of a Disease. Translated by Clare Pierard. Union Internationale Contre la Tuberculose et les.
- Dormandy, Thomas. (1999) The White Death: A History of Tuberculosis. Hambledon Press. ISBN 1852851694
- Ellison, David L. (1994) Healing Tuberculosis in the Woods: Medicine and science at the end of the nineteenth century. Praeger. ISBN 0313290059
- Elwin, Malcolm. (1953) The Life of Llewelyn Powys. London: Macdonald.
- Ryan, Frank. (1992) Tuberculosis: The Greatest Story Never Told. Bromsgrove: Swift. ISBN 1874082006
- Vidya Krishnan, (2022), Phantom Plague: How Tuberculosis Shaped our History, PublicAffairs, ISBN 9781541768468
- Green, John (2025). Everything Is Tuberculosis: The History and Persistence of Our Deadliest Infection (1st ed.). New York: Penguin Young Readers Group. ISBN 978-0-525-42605-9.

== Drug resistance ==
- Reichman, Lee B. & Janice Tanne. (2000) Timebomb: The Global Epidemic of Multi-drug Resistant Tuberculosis. McGraw-Hill. ISBN 0071359249
