= Vidya Krishnan =

Journalist

- Education: Harvard University; Oxford University; SOAS, University of London
- Occupations: Investigative Journalist, author
- Known for: COVID-19 reporting
- Notable work: Phantom Plague (2022 book)

Vidya Krishnan is a health-focused Canadian investigative journalist and author, based in Montreal. She is known for her book about Phantom Plague: How Tuberculosis Shaped our History.

== Life and career ==
Vidya Krishnan started her career in 2003 at The Pioneer newspaper. As a freelance journalist, she regularly writes for Foreign Policy, The Caravan, and The Atlantic, and The New York Times. She was previously the health editor for The Hindu.

She has reported on issues including the Rohingya genocide, tuberculosis, the right to health movement, and ethical standards in Indian clinical trials of pharmaceutical drugs. Krishnan reported facing sexual harassment at India Today in 2018.

In 2020, after years of health reporting, Krishnan spoke about navigating high levels of online harassment while reporting on COVID-19 including receiving death and rape threats.

Throughout 2021, Krishnan was critical of Indian Prime Minister Narendra Modi's response to the COVID-19 pandemic in India. She spoke about how the pandemic is disproportionately affecting poor people, and that the response is not led by scientists. She received online abuse and death threats due to her reporting about the pandemic.

She wrote one of four essays in "The Talk", a collaborative series published by The Emancipator that won an Edward R. Murrow Award in 2023. The series was about the difficult conversations taking place in the homes of marginalized families in order to keep their children safe in a society gripped by culture wars and deeply entrenched racism in the United States.

In 2025, she published her second book, White Lilies: An Essay on Grief (Westland) about poetry, Delhi and road rage.

In January 2026, she joined the People's Archive of Rural India as a Senior Fellow, reporting on rural healthcare in India.

== Selected publications ==
- Vidya Krishnan, 2022, Phantom Plague: How Tuberculosis Shaped our History, PublicAffairs, ISBN 978-1-5417-6846-8
- Vidya Krishnan, 2025, White Lilies: An Essay on Grief. New Delhi: Westland/Context, ISBN 978-9360451318.

== Awards ==
Krishnan won a Nieman Fellowship from Harvard University to study the impact of behavioral economics on antibiotic use, with a specific focus on self-medication and antibiotic resistance.

In 2017, she received the International Health Media Fellowships award. She has won the Oxford University's global health journalism fellowship, a National Press Foundation fellowship, and McGill University's global health media scholarship.
