= Interferon gamma release assay =

Type of medical test

An interferon gamma release assay (IGRA) is a medical test used in the diagnosis of some infectious diseases, especially tuberculosis. Commonly used tuberculosis IGRAs include QuantiFERON (QFT) and T-SPOT.TB (T-SPOT). The assays rely on the fact that T-lymphocytes, a type of white blood cell, will release interferon gamma (IFN-γ) when exposed to specific antigens. These tests are mostly used for tuberculosis diagnosis but IGRAs have been developed for assessing other infectious and immune-mediated diseases.

== Tuberculosis blood tests ==
The World Health Organization (WHO) recommends three types of tests to diagnose tuberculosis (TB) infection: an IGRA, a tuberculin skin test (TST), or a TB antigen-based skin test.

Latent TB (TB infection) is a condition where people have an immune response to Mycobacterium tuberculosis, the bacterium that causes TB, without any signs or symptoms of active disease. One-quarter of the world's population is estimated to have been infected with TB bacteria. Of these, 5-10% will go on to develop active TB disease.

Most people with TB infection will develop a specific immune response to the bacterium within six to eight weeks of infection. As part of the immune response, circulating T lymphocytes that recognize M. tuberculosis will release IFN-γ when they encounter the bacterium's antigens.

IGRAs measure the immune response to M. tuberculosis antigens. A sample of whole blood is incubated overnight with antigens specific to M. tuberculosis (and some other closely related bacteria that can cause TB in humans). These antigens are not found in the BCG vaccine nor in most other Mycobacterium species. In individuals with specific immunity to TB, T lymphocytes in the blood sample will bind to the antigens and release IFN-γ. TB IGRAs measure either the amount of IFN-γ released or the number of T lymphocytes that produce IFN-γ in the sample.

As of 2025, the WHO recommends five commercially available tuberculosis IGRAs for TB diagnosis: QuantiFERON-TB Gold Plus (QFT-Plus) by Qiagen, T-SPOT.TB (T-SPOT) by Oxford Immunotec/Revvity, Wantai TB-IGRA by Wantai BioPharm, STANDARD E TB-Feron by SD Biosensor, and LIAISON QFT-Plus by Diasorin and Qiagen. Many other TB IGRAs are available for use in clinical labs or are under development as of 2026, while several older assays have been discontinued by the manufacturers.
