= Latent tuberculosis =

State of tuberculosis infection without symptoms

- Other names: Latent tuberculosis infection
- Specialty: Infectious disease

Latent tuberculosis (LTB), also called latent tuberculosis infection (LTBI), is a condition that occurs when a person is infected with the bacterium Mycobacterium tuberculosis but does not have active tuberculosis (TB). The active form of the disease can be contagious, while the latent form is not; therefore, it is impossible to catch TB from someone with LTB. For LTB, various treatment regimens are used, generally requiring several months for completion.

== Epidemiology ==
As of 2023, it is estimated that one-quarter of the world's population has latent or active TB. TB is estimated to have newly infected 10.8 million people per year.

The spread of TB is uneven throughout the world: approximately 80% of the populations in many Asian and African countries test positive on tuberculin tests, while only 5–10% of the US population tests positive.

== Transmission ==
=== Latent disease ===
It is impossible to catch TB from someone with LTB. In people who develop active TB of the lungs—also called pulmonary TB—the Mantoux test is often positive. Such people are contagious and can pass the bacteria to others. TB can be transmitted by exhalation. Tiny droplets exhaled by a person with active TB can remain suspended in the air for several hours, depending on environmental conditions. Another person could then inhale these droplets and potentially become infected with TB. However, such infection is unlikely to occur, because infection generally requires longer exposure. This reduced probability includes brief exposures that occur when a person is exposed to TB during brief social contact; prolonged exposure (over two months or so, e.g., by living with a relative with TB) is generally required for TB infection.

Statistics show that approximately one-third of people exposed to pulmonary TB become infected with the bacteria, but only one in ten of these infected people develop active TB disease during their lifetime. People with latent TB are not contagious and do not feel sick. However, latent infections can become active TB infections, which are contagious, at a later time.

In countries such as Canada and the United States, people have medical privacy or confidentiality, so they are not required to reveal their active TB diagnosis to family, friends, or coworkers. A person knows that they have been exposed to TB only through required testing for certain jobs; developing symptoms of active TB; or testing by a medical doctor. Because TB is uncommon in the US, doctors may not initially suspect TB; therefore, they may not test for potential infection. If a patient shows symptoms of TB, it is prudent for them to be tested.

Diabetes is associated with a significantly increased risk of progression from latent to active TB, and the mortality rate from TB may be higher in patients with diabetes. People with both human immunodeficiency virus (HIV) and LTB have a 10% chance of developing active TB each year. "HIV infection is the greatest known risk factor for the progression of latent M. tuberculosis infection to active TB. In many African countries, 30–60% of all new TB cases occur in people with HIV, and TB is the leading cause of death globally for HIV-infected people."

=== Reactivation ===
A diagnosis of LTBI, with confirmation that no TB disease is active, requires ongoing vigilance for symptoms of active TB. A full course of treatment does not guarantee that all M. tuberculosis bacteria have been eliminated. When a person develops active TB, symptoms may be mild for many months. Such symptoms can lead to delays in a person's seeking medical care, as well as result in the transmission of the bacteria to others.

TB bacteria may exist in latent form both inside and outside the lungs. In many cases, the bacteria may be latent in another organ, with no remaining bacteria in the lungs. If reactivation of TB occurs in the brain, organs, kidneys, joints, or other areas, symptoms are often slow to progress, frequently being ignored by patients until they become severe. Extrapulmonary tuberculosis (TB outside of the lungs) can affect virtually any organ, with distinct manifestations depending on the location: TB in the spine causes back pain and potential paralysis; lymph node involvement presents as painless or occasionally painful swelling in the neck or armpits; meningeal infection triggers persistent headaches and altered consciousness; and urogenital tuberculosis leads to painful urination, blood in urine, and infertility. All of these manifestations may feature generalized symptoms such as fever, night sweats, and weight loss; these symptoms, combined with their nonspecific presentations and lower amounts of bacteria, make the underlying conditions more difficult to diagnose than the classic pulmonary disease.

=== Risk factors ===
Situations in which TB may become reactivated are the following:

- The onset of a disease affecting the immune system (such as acquired immunodeficiency syndrome [AIDS]) or a disease whose treatment affects the immune system (such as chemotherapy for cancer; systemic steroids for asthma; or Enbrel, Humira, or Orencia for rheumatoid arthritis)
- Malnutrition, which may result from illness or injury affecting the digestive system; a prolonged period of not eating; or a disturbance in food availability, such as during a famine or while residing in a refugee or concentration camp
- Degradation of the immune system because of aging
- Certain systemic diseases, such as diabetes
- Other conditions, such as debilitating disease (especially hematological and some solid cancers), the use of long-term steroid medication, end-stage renal disease, silicosis, gastrectomy, and jejuno-ileal bypass
- Old age
- Young age

=== Concomitant immunity ===
Compared to uninfected individuals, people with LTB appear to have some (35–80%) protection against developing active TB after exposure to M. tuberculosis in the environment. This type of protection is called concomitant immunity. Such immunity seems to be due to the presence of tissue-resident memory T cells.

== Diagnosis ==
Two classes of tests are commonly used to identify patients with LTB: tuberculin skin tests and Interferon-gamma (IFN-γ) tests.

The skin test is the Mantoux test and the now-obsolete Heaf test

The three IFN-γ tests include the following:

- T-SPOT.TB
- QuantiFERON-TB Gold
- QuantiFERON-TB Gold In-Tube

=== Tuberculin skin testing ===
The tuberculin skin test (TST) was first developed in 1908 as the Mantoux test. Tuberculin (also called purified protein derivative or PPD) is a standardized dead extract of cultured TB, which is injected into the skin to measure a person's immune response to the bacteria. If a person has been previously exposed to the bacteria, they should express an immune reaction to the injection, usually a mild swelling or redness around the injection site. There have been two primary methods of TST: the Mantoux test and the Heaf test. The Heaf test was discontinued in 2005 because the manufacturer deemed its production to be financially unsustainable. Nevertheless, this test was previously preferred in the United Kingdom (UK) for two reasons: it may require less training to administer, and it involved less interobserver variation in interpretation than the Mantoux test did. The Mantoux test was the preferred test in the US, and it is the most widely used TST globally.

==== Mantoux test ====
See: Mantoux test

The Mantoux test is standardized by the World Health Organization (WHO). Tuberculin at 0.1 milliliter (mL; 100 units/mL), which delivers a dose of 5 units, is given by intradermal injection into the surface of the lower forearm (subcutaneous injection results in false negatives). A waterproof ink mark is drawn around the injection site so as to facilitate finding it later if the reaction level is small. The test response is read 48 to 72 hours later. The area of induration (not of erythema) is measured transversely across the forearm (i.e., left to right, not up and down) and recorded to the nearest millimeter (mm).

==== Heaf test ====
See: Heaf test

The Heaf test was first described in 1951. This test uses a Heaf gun with disposable single-use heads; each head contains six needles arranged in a circle. There are standard heads and pediatric heads: the standard head is used on all patients aged 2 and older; the pediatric head is for infants under the age of 2. For the standard head, the needles protrude 2 mm when the gun is actuated; for the pediatric heads, the needles protrude 1 mm. The skin is first cleaned with alcohol, and then tuberculin (100,000 units/mL) is evenly smeared on the skin (about 0.1 mL); the gun is then applied to the skin and fired. Any excess solution is then wiped off, and a waterproof ink mark is drawn around the injection site. The test response is read 2 to 7 days later, using the following guide:

- Grade 0: no reaction, or induration of three or fewer puncture points
- Grade 1: induration of four or more puncture points
- Grade 2: induration of the six puncture points coalesces to form a circle
- Grade 3: induration of 5 mm or more
- Grade 4: induration of 10 mm or more, or ulceration

The results of both tests are roughly equivalent, as follows:

- Heaf grades 0 and 1 ~ Mantoux less than 5 mm
- Heaf grade 2 ~ Mantoux 5–14 mm
- Heaf grades 3 and 4 ~ Mantoux 15 mm or greater

==== Tuberculin conversion ====
Tuberculin conversion is said to occur if a patient who previously had a negative tuberculin skin test shows a positive tuberculin skin test at a later date. This indicates a change from negative to positive status, and it usually signifies a new infection.

==== Boosting ====
The phenomenon of boosting is one way to obtain a false-positive test result. Theoretically, a person's ability to develop a reaction to the TST may decrease over time—for example, a person is infected with latent TB as a child and is administered a TST as an adult. Because so much time has passed since the immune response to TB was necessary, that person might show a negative test result. If so, there is a reasonable probability that the TST triggers a hypersensitivity response in the person's immune system, and the body overreacts to what it perceives as a reinfection. In this case, when that person receives the test again (as is standard procedure), they may have a significantly greater reaction to the test, showing a strong positive; this result is commonly misdiagnosed as tuberculin conversion. This result can also be triggered by receiving the Bacillus Calmette–Guérin (BCG) vaccine against TB, rather than having a proper infection. Although boosting can occur in any age group, the likelihood of such a reaction increases with age.

Boosting is only likely to be relevant if a person (e.g., a health care worker) is beginning to undergo periodic TSTs. In this case, the standard procedure is called two-step testing. The person is given their first test; in the event of a negative result, they receive a second test in 1 to 3 weeks. This double administration is done to combat boosting in situations where—if that person had waited up to a year to get their next TST—they might still have a boosted reaction and be misdiagnosed as having a new infection.

The US and UK guidelines differ. In the US, testers are advised to ignore the possibility of a false positive due to the BCG vaccine, because the BCG is seen as having waning efficacy over time. Therefore, the Centers for Disease Control and Prevention (CDC) urges that people be treated based on risk stratification, regardless of BCG vaccination history. If a person shows a negative and then a positive TST, they are assessed for full TB treatment—beginning with an X-ray to confirm that TB is not active—and proceeding from there. Conversely, the UK guidelines acknowledge the potential effect of the BCG vaccination, because it is mandatory and therefore a prevalent concern. The UK shares the procedure of administering two tests, 1 week apart, and accepting the second one as the accurate result; however, the UK also assumes that a second positive indicates an old infection (and therefore certainly LTBI) or the BCG itself. In the case of BCG vaccinations that confuse results, Interferon-γ (IFN-γ) tests may be used because they are unaffected by the BCG.

==== Interpretation ====
According to the US guidelines, there are multiple size thresholds for declaring a positive result of LTB from the Mantoux test. For people from high-risk groups (such as those who are HIV positive), the cutoff is 5 mm of induration; for medium risk groups, 10 mm; for low-risk groups, 15 mm. The US guidelines recommend that a history of previous BCG vaccination be ignored. Details of tuberculin skin test interpretation are available in the CDC guidelines.

The UK guidelines are based on the Heaf test. In people who have had BCG previously, LTB is diagnosed if the Heaf test response is grade 3 or 4, and people have no signs or symptoms of active TB. If the Heaf test response is grade 0 or 1, then the test is repeated. In people who have not had BCG previously, latent TB is diagnosed if the Heaf test response is grade 2, 3, or 4, and people have no signs or symptoms of active TB. Repeat Heaf testing is not performed for patients who have had BCG (because of boosting). Details of tuberculin skin test interpretation are available in the British Thoracic Society (BTS) guidelines.

Given that the US recommendation is to ignore prior BCG vaccination when interpreting tuberculin skin tests, false positives with the Mantoux test are possible as a result of two factors: having previously had a BCG vaccine (even many years prior), or periodic testing with tuberculin skin tests. Having regular TSTs boosts the immunological response in people who have previously had BCG, so these people falsely appear as tuberculin conversions. This situation may lead to treating more people than is necessary, with the risk of those people developing adverse drug reactions. However, because the BCG vaccine is not 100% effective—and is less protective in adults than in pediatric patients—not treating these people could potentially lead to infection. The current US policy seems to reflect a choice to focus on infection control.

In addition, the US guidelines allow for tuberculin skin testing in immunosuppressed people (those with HIV, or who are on immunosuppressive drugs), whereas the UK guidelines recommend that tuberculin skin tests not be used for such people because it is unreliable. Interpretation of skin tests is limited by false positives in patients who have received BCG vaccination and false negatives in immune-suppressed patients.

=== Interferon-γ testing ===
The role of IFN-γ tests is undergoing constant review, and various guidelines have been published with an option for revision as new data becomes available.

Two interferon-γ release assays (IGRAs) are currently available commercially: QuantiFERON-TB Gold and T-SPOT.TB. These tests are not affected by prior BCG vaccination, and they assess the body's response to specific TB antigens not present in other forms of mycobacteria and BCG (ESAT-6). While these tests are new, they are becoming available globally.

CDC guidance:

CDC recommends that QFT-G may be used in all circumstances in which the TST is currently used, including contact investigations, evaluation of recent immigrants, and sequential-testing surveillance programs for infection control (e.g., those for health-care workers).

Health Protection Agency (HPA) interim guidance:

The HPA recommends the use of IGRA testing in health care workers, if available, in view of the importance of detecting latently infected staff who may go on to develop active disease and come into contact with immunocompromised patients and the logistical simplicity of IGRA testing.

=== Drug-resistant strains ===
Most medical practitioners usually assume that in the early stages of a diagnosis, a case of LTB is the normal strain of TB. It is therefore most commonly treated with isoniazid (the most used treatment for LTB). Only if the TB bacteria do not respond to treatment does the medical practitioner begin to consider more virulent strains, requiring significantly longer and more thorough treatment regimens.

Four types of TB are recognized in the world:

- TB
- Multi-drug-resistant tuberculosis (MDR TB)
- Extensively drug-resistant tuberculosis (XDR TB)
- Totally drug-resistant tuberculosis (TDR TB)

== Treatment ==
The treatment of LTBI is essential for controlling and eliminating TB by reducing the risk that a TB infection progresses to disease. LTB converts to active TB in 10% of cases (or more frequently with immunocompromised patients). Taking medication for LTB is recommended by many doctors.

In the US, the standard treatment is nine months of isoniazid, but this regimen is not widely used outside the US.

=== Terminology ===
There is no agreement regarding terminology: the terms preventive therapy and chemoprophylaxis have been used for decades, and they are preferred in the UK because the process involves giving medication to patients who have no disease and are currently well; the reason for giving medication is primarily to prevent patients from becoming unwell. In the US, physicians discuss LTB treatment because the medication does not actually prevent infection; the patient is already infected, and the medication is intended to prevent existing silent infection from becoming active disease. There are no convincing reasons to prefer one term over the other.

=== Specific situations ===
"Populations at increased risk of progressing to active infection once exposed:

- Persons with recent TB infection [those infected within the previous 2 years]
- Congenital or acquired immunosuppressed patients (in particular, HIV-positive patients)
- Illicit intravenous drug users; alcohol and other chronic substance users
- Children (particularly those younger than 4 years old)
- Persons with comorbid conditions (i.e., chronic kidney failure, diabetes, malignancy, hematologic cancers, body weight of at least 10% less than ideal, silicosis, gastrectomy, jejunoileal bypass, asthma, or other disorders requiring long-term use of corticosteroids or other immunosuppressants)."

=== Treatment regimens ===
Assessment to rule out active TB must be carried out before treatment for LTBI is started. To give treatment for LTB to someone with active TB is a serious error: the TB is inadequately treated, and there is a serious risk of developing drug-resistant strains of TB.

Several treatment regimens are currently in use:

- 9H—isoniazid for 9 months is the gold standard. It is 93% effective in patients with positive test results and fibrotic pulmonary lesions compatible with TB.
- 6H—isoniazid for 6 months might be adopted by a local TB program based on cost-effectiveness and patient compliance. This is the regimen currently recommended in the UK for routine use. The US guidance excludes this regimen from use in children or people with radiographic evidence of prior TB (old fibrotic lesions). It is 69% effective.
- 6 to 9H_{2}—An intermittent twice-weekly regimen for the preceding two treatment regimens is an alternative if administered under directly observed therapy (DOT).
- 4R—rifampicin for 4 months is an alternative for those who cannot take isoniazid or who have had known exposure to isoniazid-resistant TB.
- 3HR—isoniazid and rifampin may be given daily for 3 months.
- 2RZ—a 2-month regimen of rifampin and pyrazinamide is no longer recommended for treatment of LTBI because of the greatly increased risk of drug-induced hepatitis and death.
- 3HP—a 3-month (12-dose) regimen of weekly rifapentine and isoniazid. The 3HP regimen must be administered under DOT. A self-administered therapy (SAT) of 3HP has been investigated in a large international study.

=== Evidence for treatment effectiveness ===
The Cochrane organization performed a systematic research review in 2000; it contained 11 double-blinded, randomized controlled trials and 73,375 patients. The review examined 6- and 12-month courses of isoniazid (INH) for treating LTB. HIV-positive patients, as well as patients currently or previously treated for TBs, were excluded. The main finding was a relative risk (RR) of 0.40 (95% confidence interval [CI] 0.31 to 0.52) for development of active TB over 2 years or longer for patients treated with INH. There was no significant difference between treatment courses of 6 or 12 months (RR 0.44, 95% CI 0.27 to 0.73 for 6 months; RR 0.38, 95% CI 0.28 to 0.50 for 12 months).

A Cochrane systematic review published in 2013 evaluated four regimens as alternatives to INH monotherapy for preventing active TB in HIV-negative people with LTB infection. This review found no difference between shorter regimens of rifampicin, or weekly directly observed rifapentine plus INH, compared to INH monotherapy in preventing active TB in at-risk HIV-negative people. However, the review found that the shorter rifampicin regimen for 4 months, and weekly directly observed rifapentine plus INH for 3 months, "may have additional advantages of higher treatment completion and improved safety." However the overall quality of evidence was low to moderate (per GRADE criteria); none of the included trials were conducted in low- to middle-income countries (LMIC) with high TB transmission, and hence these trials might not apply to countries with high rates of TB transmission.

=== Treatment efficacy ===
There is no guaranteed "cure" for LTB. "People infected with TB bacteria have a lifetime risk of falling ill with TB..."; those who have compromised immune systems, those with diabetes, and those who use tobacco are at greater risk.

A person who has taken a complete course of isoniazid (or other full-course prescription for TB) on a regular, timely schedule may have been cured. "Current standard therapy is isoniazid (INH) which reduces the risk of active TB by as much as 90 percent (in patients with positive LTBI test results and fibrotic pulmonary lesions compatible with tuberculosis) if taken daily for 9 months." However, if a person has not completed the medication course exactly as prescribed, a "cure" is less likely, and the "cure" rate is directly proportional to following the prescribed treatment specifically as recommended. Furthermore, "If you don't take the medicine correctly and you become sick with TB a second time, the TB may be harder to treat if it has become drug resistant." If a patient were cured in the strictest definition of the word, this would imply that every single bacterium in the system is removed or dead, and that the person cannot get TB (unless reinfected). However, there is no test to assure that every single bacterium has been killed in a patient's system. For this reason, a person diagnosed with LTB can safely assume that, even after treatment, they still carry the bacteria—likely for the rest of their lives. Furthermore, "It has been estimated that up to one-third of the world's population is infected with M. tuberculosis, and this population is an important reservoir for disease reactivation." In areas where TB is endemic, treatment may be even less certain to "cure" TB, because reinfection could trigger activation of LTB already present even in cases where treatment was followed completely.

== Controversy ==
There is some controversy over whether people who test positive long after infection have a significant risk of developing the disease (without reinfection). Some researchers and public health officials have warned that this test-positive population is a "source of future TB cases" even in the US and other wealthy countries, and that this "ticking time bomb" should be a focus of attention and resources.

On the other hand, medical researchers Marcel Behr, Paul Edelstein, and Lalita Ramakrishnan reviewed studies on the concept of LTB to determine whether TB-infected persons have a lifelong infection capable of causing disease at any later time. These studies, both published in the British Medical Journal (BMJ) in 2018 and 2019, show that the incubation period of TB is short, usually within months after infection, and very rarely more than two years after infection. These studies also show that more than 90% of people infected with M. tuberculosis for more than two years never develop TB, even if their immune systems are severely suppressed. Immunologic tests for TB infection—such as the tuberculin skin test and IGRAs—only indicate past infection, with the majority of previously infected persons no longer capable of developing TB. Ramakrishnan told the New York Times newspaper that researchers "have spent hundreds of millions of dollars chasing after latency, but the whole idea that a quarter of the world is infected with TB is based on a fundamental misunderstanding."

Writing in The Atlantic magazine, science journalist Katherine J. Wu explains:

If the bacteria were lingering, researchers would expect to see a big spike in disease late in life among people with positive skin tests, as their immune system naturally weakens. They would also expect to see a high rate of progression to full-blown TB among people who start taking immunosuppressive drugs or catch HIV. And yet, neither of those trends pans out: At most, some 5 to 10 percent of people who have tested positive by skin test and later sustain a blow to their immune system develop TB disease within about three to five years—a hint that, for almost everyone else, there may not be any MTB left. "If there were a slam-dunk experiment, that's it," William Bishai, a TB researcher at Johns Hopkins, told me.

In the medical journal The BMJ, the first article disputing widespread latency was accompanied by an editorial written by Dr. Soumya Swaminathan, Deputy Director-General of the World Health Organization, who endorsed the findings; she called for more funding of TB research directed at the most heavily afflicted parts of the world, rather than paying disproportionate attention to a relatively minor problem that affects only wealthy countries.

The WHO no longer endorses the concept that all people with immunologic evidence of past TB infection are currently infected, and are therefore at risk of developing TB some time later. In 2022, the WHO issued corrigenda to its Global Tuberculosis Report 2021 to clarify estimates of the worldwide burden of infected people. These corrigenda deleted the statement "About a quarter of the world's population is infected with M. tuberculosis" and replaced it with "About a quarter of the world's population has been infected with M. tuberculosis." The corrigenda also removed a prior estimate of the lifetime risk of TB as 5–10% among those with evidence of past TB infection; the WHO indicated that they no longer have confidence in earlier estimates that a substantial percentage of those with positive immunologic test results later develop the disease. In 2026, Alvaro Schwalb and colleagues estimated that the number of people worldwide with viable M. tuberculosis infection was 289M, or about 3.5% of the world's population (Schwalb, PMID 41642936)

== See also ==
- Silent disease
