= Post-tuberculosis lung disease =

Long term complication of tuberculosis

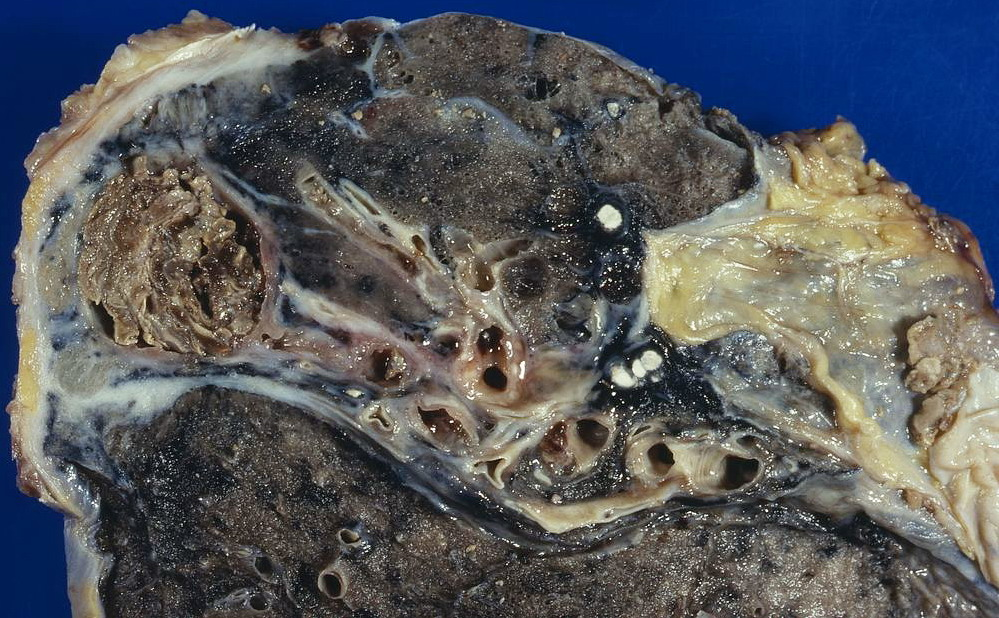
Aspergilloma in an old tuberculosis cavity; healed, calcified tuberculous lesions are also present towards the right of the image

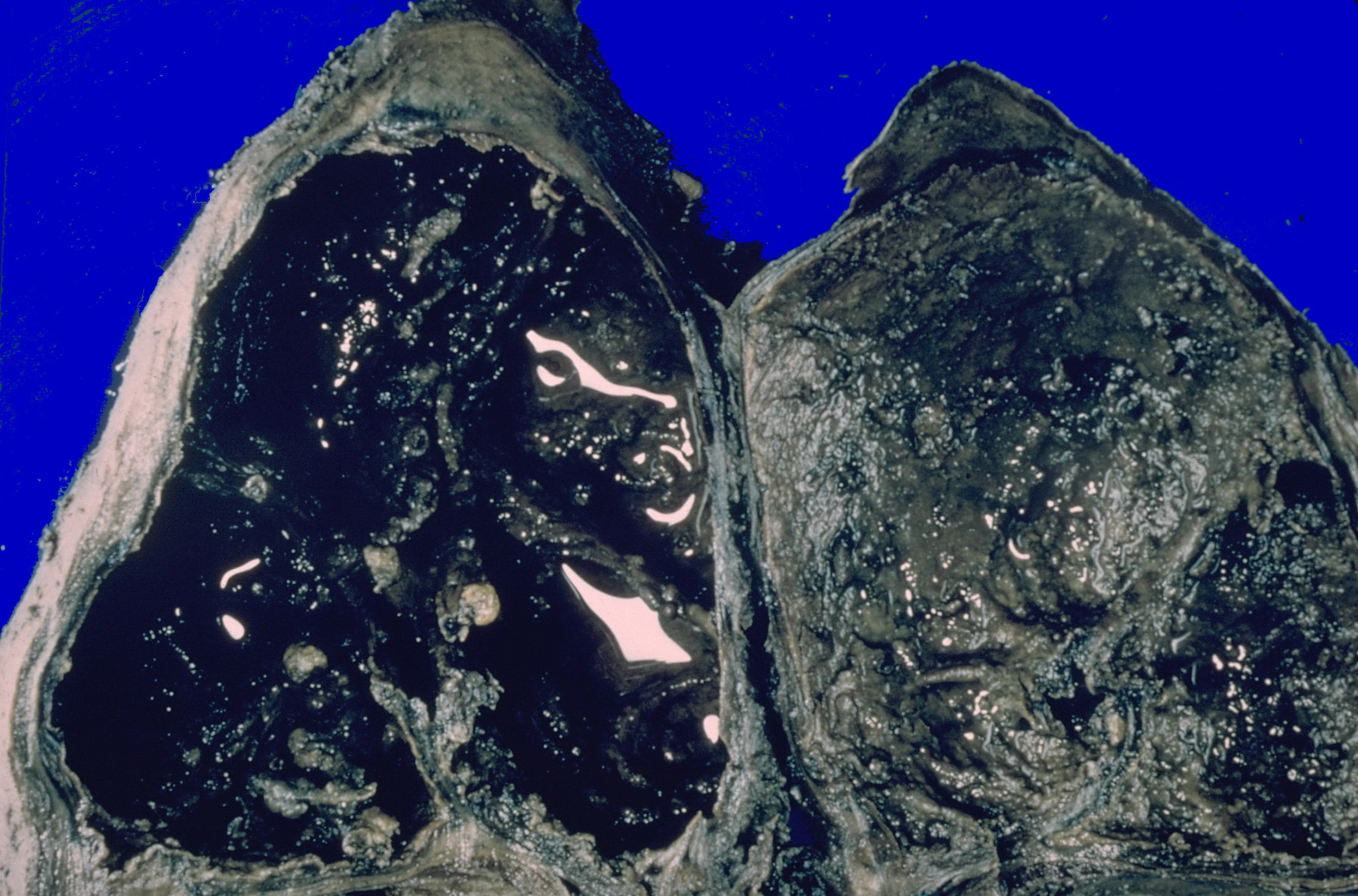
Healed tuberculous cavity, where the entire left lung is destroyed

Post-tuberculosis lung disease (PTLD) is ongoing lung disease that is caused by tuberculosis (TB) but persists after the infection is cured. PTLD can affect the airways, lung parenchyma, pulmonary vasculature, and pleura.

== Epidemiology ==
PTLD affects a substantial proportion of TB survivors (of whom there were an estimated 155 million globally in 2020), estimated as much as 50 percent overall and more than 70 percent in survivors of multi-drug-resistant tuberculosis. Around 10 percent have lost more than half of their lung function. Delayed diagnosis of TB, multidrug-resistant tuberculosis, and repeated TB infections are correlated with greater incidence of PTLD. People who have HIV are less likely to have PTLD, possibly because of their impaired immune response. Cigarette smokers are 25% more likely to have lung damage, and more severe damage, after cure of a TB infection. People who cook with 3-4 stoves instead of 1-2 stoves are more likely to have lung damage. A lack of heating also increased how often symptoms occurred. Alcoholism also increased the risk of PTLD. Ambient air pollution did not increase the risk of PTLD. These kinds of pollution include methods of household lighting; modes of household ventilation; secondary cigarette smoking; urban, rural or traffic exposures. Food insecurity, eating cereals, and consuming oily food were strongly associated with symptomatic PTLD. Eating fruits and drinking juice at least once a week were associated with reduced odds of developing symptomatic PTLD. Co-infection may make lung damage worse, and thus vaccination is recommended to prevent PTLD. Many studies have found a link between TB and later diagnosis with chronic obstructive pulmonary disease.

== Signs and symptoms ==
A large number of people who survived tuberculosis still experience symptoms such as breathlessness and coughing. Although the severity is not well understood, some people have reduced quality of life and exercise capacity. In severe cases, people may experience hospitalizations and death related to respiratory causes.

There is no accepted diagnosis criteria for PTLD, and existing research does not use a clearly defined study population.

=== Findings ===
Common radiological findings after TB include lesions to the airway, such as obstructive lung disease and bronchiectasis, lesions to the parenchyma, such as calcification, fibrosis, and Aspergillosis, chronic pleural disease, pulmonary hypertension, and other findings. Radiological findings are distinct from chronic obstructive pulmonary disease (COPD) associated with cigarette smoking, although symptoms are similar.

== Effects ==
Although prospective data is not available, it is believed that people with PTLD have a lower life expectancy and higher risk of TB recurrence compared to those not affected. Besides PTLD, tuberculosis survivors may be afflicted with "cardiovascular and pericardial disorders, neurological impairments, as well as psychological and socioeconomic effects.".

== Society and culture ==
PTLD is not mentioned in most TB treatment guidelines, or in the World Health Organization (WHO)'s End TB strategy.
