= Exercise capacity =

Maximum sustained physical exertion

Exercise capacity is defined as "the maximum amount of physical exertion that a patient can sustain".
