= Concomitant immunity =

Concomitant immunity is the phenomenon where an individual with a persistent infection displays immunity to re-infections caused by similar pathogens. In other words, the persistence of the primary infection prevents the occurrence of secondary infections. The presence of concomitant immunity depends on the nature of the immune response caused by a latent infection and hence differs from pathogen to pathogen. The concept was originally developed in tumor immunology, where a mouse with a tumor graft does not allow a second tumor graft of the same type to develop. It has also been called premunition, nonsterilizing immunity, and infection-immunity. Being dependent on an existing infection, it is a type of acquired immunity.

Pathogens that display concomitant immunity
Pathogen	Mechanism
Lymphocytic choriomeningitis virus	"relatively long-lived" effector-like memory T cells at nonlymphoid sites
Leishmania major	"relatively short-lived" CD4+ regulatory T cells and CD4+ effector T cells
Onchocerca volvulus	Unclear, known to occur based on cytokine and antibody evidence
Schistosoma	Unclear, proposed to display concomitant immunity
Mycobacterium tuberculosis	tissue-resident Memory T cells with an estimated lifespan of 2–3 years
