= Pentalenolactone F synthase =

Identifiers
- EC no.: 1.14.11.36

Databases
- IntEnz: IntEnz view
- BRENDA: BRENDA entry
- ExPASy: NiceZyme view
- KEGG: KEGG entry
- MetaCyc: metabolic pathway
- PRIAM: profile
- PDB structures: RCSB PDB PDBe PDBsum
Search
- PMC: articles
- PubMed: articles
- NCBI: proteins

Pentalenolactone F synthase (EC 1.14.11.36, PEND (gene), PNTD (gene), PTLD (gene)) is an enzyme with systematic name pentalenolactone-D,2-oxoglutarate:oxygen oxidoreductase. This enzyme catalyses the following chemical reaction

pentalenolactone D + 2 2-oxoglutarate + 2 O_{2} $\rightleftharpoons$ pentalenolactone F + 2 succinate + 2 CO_{2} + H_{2}O (overall reaction)
(1a) pentalenolactone D + 2-oxoglutarate + O_{2} $\rightleftharpoons$ pentalenolactone E + succinate + CO_{2} + H_{2}O
(1b) pentalenolactone E + 2-oxoglutarate + O_{2} $\rightleftharpoons$ pentalenolactone F + succinate + CO_{2}

Pentalenolactone F synthase contains Fe(II), and ascorbate is needed for its action.
