= Tuberculosis =

Infectious disease

- Other names: Phthisis, phthisis pulmonalis, consumption, white death, great white plague
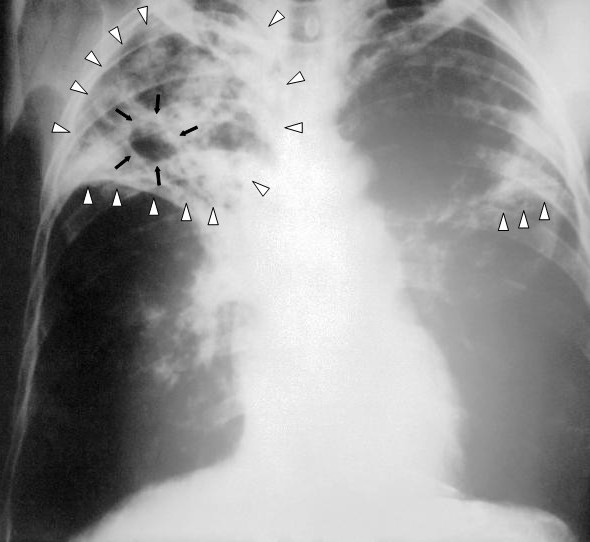
- Chest X-ray of a person with advanced tuberculosis: Infection in both lungs is marked by white arrowheads, and black arrows mark the formation of a cavity.
- Pronunciation: /tjuːˌbɜːrkjuːˈloʊsɪs/ tew-BUR-kew-LOH-siss, also /ˌtjuːbər-/ TEW-bər-
- Specialty: Infectious disease, pulmonology
- Symptoms: Active: Chronic cough, fever, cough with bloody mucus, weight loss Latent: None
- Causes: Mycobacterium tuberculosis
- Risk factors: Immunodeficiency
- Diagnostic method: CXR, microbial culture, TB skin test, interferon gamma release assay
- Differential diagnosis: Pneumonia, histoplasmosis, sarcoidosis, coccidioidomycosis
- Prevention: Screening those at high risk, treatment of those infected, vaccination with bacillus Calmette-Guérin (BCG)
- Treatment: Antibiotics
- Frequency: 10.7 million new infections per year (2024)
- Deaths: 1.23 million per year

Tuberculosis (TB), known historically as consumption, is a contagious infection usually caused by Mycobacterium tuberculosis (MTB) bacteria. It often initially infects the lungs, but can spread to other parts of the body. Most infections show no symptoms, in which case tuberculosis is considered to be inactive or latent. A small proportion of latent infections progress to active disease that, if left untreated, can be fatal. Typical symptoms of active TB are chronic cough with blood-containing mucus, fever, night sweats, and weight loss. Infection of other organs can cause a wide range of symptoms.

Tuberculosis is spread from one person to the next through the air when people who have active TB in their lungs cough, spit, speak, or sneeze. People with latent TB do not spread the disease. A latent infection is more likely to become active in individuals with weakened immune systems. There are three principal tests for TB: the interferon-gamma release assay (IGRA), the tuberculin skin test, and the nucleic acid amplification test (NAAT).

Prevention involves screening those at high risk, early detection and treatment of cases, and vaccination with the bacillus Calmette-Guérin (BCG) vaccine. Those at high risk include household, workplace, and social contacts of people with active TB. Treatment requires the use of multiple antibiotics over a long period of time.

Latent TB is estimated to affect one-quarter of the world's population, approximately 2 billion people. In 2024, new cases per year reached an estimated 10.7 million people and caused 1.23 million deaths, making it the leading cause of death from a infectious agent worldwide. Tuberculosis has been present in humans since ancient times. In the 1800s TB was responsible for an estimated quarter of all deaths in Europe. Both the incidence (new cases) and prevalence (total cases) of TB declined significantly during the 20th century, attributed to improved sanitation, the discovery of effective antibiotics, and the introduction of the BCG vaccine. However, since the 1980s, antibiotic resistance has become a growing phenomenon, which led to a higher incidence of multidrug-resistant tuberculosis.

Video summary (script)

== Signs and symptoms ==
The main symptoms of variants and stages of tuberculosis are given, with many symptoms overlapping with other variants, while others are more, but not entirely, specific for certain variants. Symptoms for chart sourced from EMedicine and WrongDiagnosis.com.

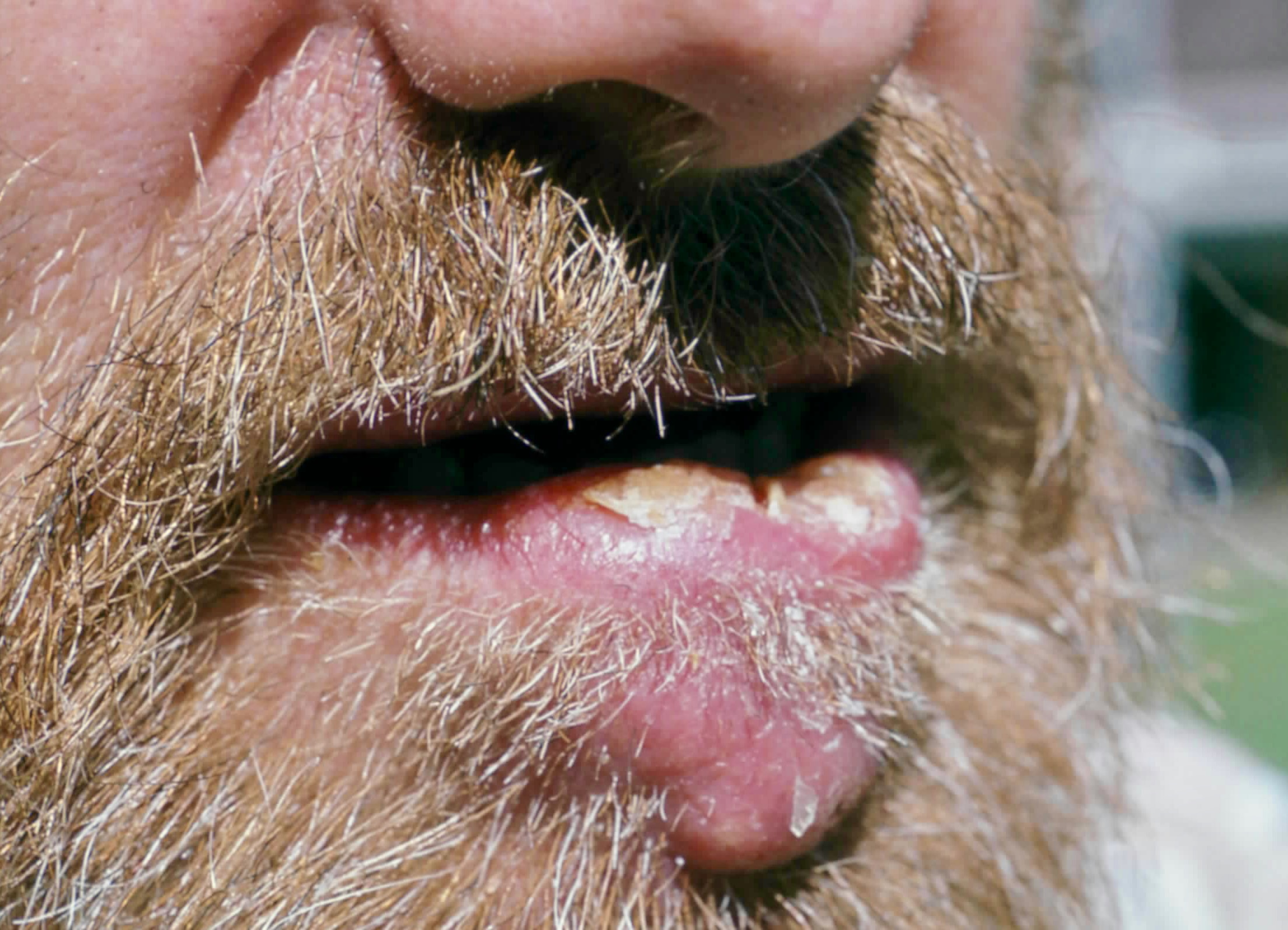
Tuberculosis of the lip, secondary to pulmonary TB

There is a popular misconception that tuberculosis is purely a disease of the lungs that manifests as coughing. Tuberculosis may infect many organs, even though it most commonly occurs in the lungs (known as pulmonary tuberculosis). Extrapulmonary TB occurs when tuberculosis develops in organs other than the lungs; it may coexist with pulmonary TB.

General signs and symptoms include fever, chills, night sweats, loss of appetite, weight loss, and fatigue.

=== Latent tuberculosis ===
The majority of individuals with TB infection show no symptoms, a state known as inactive or latent tuberculosis. This condition is not contagious, and can be detected by the tuberculin skin test (TST) and the interferon-gamma release assay (IGRA); other tests should be conducted to eliminate the possibility of active TB. Without treatment, an estimated 5% to 15% of cases will progress into active TB during the person's lifetime.

=== Lungs ===
If tuberculosis does become active, it involves the lungs in about 90% of cases. Symptoms may include chest pain, a prolonged cough producing sputum which may be bloody, tiredness, temperature, loss of appetite, wasting and general malaise. In very rare cases, the infection may erode into the pulmonary artery or a Rasmussen aneurysm, resulting in massive bleeding.

Tuberculosis may cause extensive scarring of the lungs, which persists after successful disease treatment. Survivors continue to experience chronic respiratory symptoms such as cough, sputum production, and shortness of breath.

Pulmonary tuberculosis can occasionally be complicated by pleural disease, including empyema and pneumothorax; when both pus and air accumulate in the pleural space, the condition is termed pyopneumothorax. These complications are associated with extensive or cavitary disease.

=== Extrapulmonary ===
In 15–20% of active cases, the infection spreads outside the lungs, causing other kinds of TB. These are collectively denoted as extrapulmonary tuberculosis. Extrapulmonary TB occurs more commonly in people with a weakened immune system and young children. In those with HIV, this occurs in more than 50% of cases. Notable extrapulmonary infection sites include the pleura (in tuberculous pleurisy), the central nervous system (in tuberculous meningitis), the lymphatic system (in scrofula of the neck), the genitourinary system (in urogenital tuberculosis), and the bones and joints (in Pott disease of the spine), among others. A potentially more serious, widespread form of TB is called "disseminated tuberculosis"; it is also known as miliary tuberculosis. Miliary TB currently makes up about 10% of extrapulmonary cases.

Symptoms of extrapulmonary TB usually include the general signs and symptoms as above, with additional symptoms related to the part of the body which is affected. Urogenital tuberculosis, however, typically presents differently, as this manifestation most commonly appears decades after the resolution of pulmonary symptoms. Most patients with chronic urogenital TB do not have pulmonary symptoms at the time of diagnosis. Urogenital tuberculosis most commonly presents with urinary "storage symptoms" such as increased frequency and/or urgency of urination, flank pain, hematuria, and nonspecific symptoms such as fever and malaise.

== Causes ==
=== Mycobacteria ===
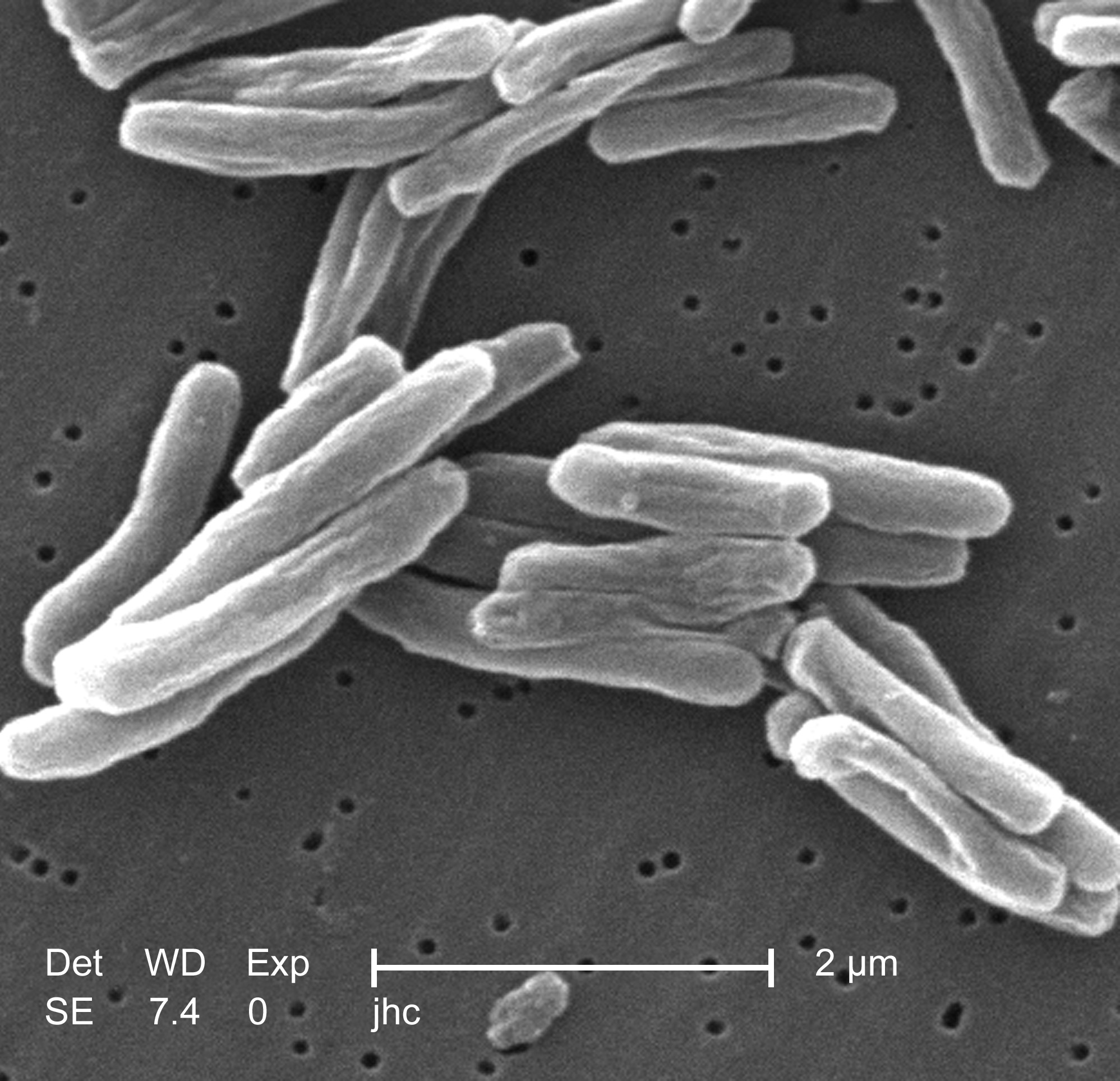
Scanning electron micrograph of M. tuberculosis

The principal microbial cause of TB is Mycobacterium tuberculosis (MTB), a small, aerobic, non-motile and rod-shaped bacillus. It divides every 16 to 20 hours, which is slow compared with other bacteria, which usually divide in less than an hour. Mycobacteria have a complex, lipid-rich cell envelope, with the high lipid content of the outer membrane acting as a robust barrier contributing to their drug resistance. If a Gram stain is performed, MTB either stains very weakly "Gram-positive" or does not retain dye as a result of the high lipid and mycolic acid content of its cell wall. MTB can withstand weak disinfectants and survive in a dry state for weeks. In nature, the bacterium can grow only within the cells of a host organism, but M. tuberculosis can be cultured in the laboratory.

The term M. tuberculosis complex describes a genetically related group of Mycobacterium species that can cause tuberculosis in humans or other animals. Among its members are four other TB-causing mycobacteria: M. bovis, M. africanum, M. canettii, and M. microti. M. bovis causes bovine TB and was once a common cause of human TB, but the introduction of pasteurized milk has almost eliminated this as a public health problem in developed countries. M. africanum is not widespread, but it is a significant cause of human TB in parts of Africa. M. canettii is rare and seems to be limited to the Horn of Africa, although a few cases have been seen in African emigrants. M. microti appears to have a natural reservoir in small rodents such as mice and voles, but can infect larger mammals. It is rare in humans and is seen almost only in immunodeficient people, although its prevalence may be significantly underestimated.

There are other known mycobacteria which cause lung disease resembling TB. M. avium complex is an environmental microorganism found in soil and water sources worldwide, which tends to present as an opportunistic infection in immunocompromised people. The natural reservoir of M. kansasii is unknown, but it has been found in tap water; it is most likely to infect humans with lung disease or who smoke. These two species are classified as "nontuberculous mycobacteria".

=== Spread ===
Tuberculosis spreads through the air when people with active pulmonary TB cough, sneeze, speak, or sing, releasing tiny airborne droplets containing the bacteria. Anyone nearby can breathe in these droplets and become infected. The droplets can remain airborne and infectious for several hours, and are more likely to persist in poorly ventilated areas. TB is not spread by shaking hands, sharing food, drinks, or utensils, touching bed linens and toilet seats, sharing toothbrushes, or kissing.

=== Risk factors ===
Tuberculosis cases attributable to risk factors

Risk factors for TB include exposure to droplets from people with active TB, as well as environmental and health-condition-related factors that decrease a person's immune system response.

People deemed to be at higher risk for exposure to or infection from M. tuberculosis include those who frequently travel to or live in countries where TB disease is common; residents and employees of densely-occupied settings such as homeless shelters, detention and correctional facilities, and nursing homes; health care workers; populations defined locally as having an increased incidence of TB disease; those who are malnourished; and residents of resource-poor communities.

There is a strong correlation between the risk for TB and socioeconomic status (SES). Specifically, people of low SES are more likely to contract TB. They also have more risk factors for TB disease, including malnutrition, HIV co-infection, more exposure to crowded and poorly ventilated spaces, and limited access to healthcare. Moreover, inadequate healthcare translates to those living with TB disease not being diagnosed and treated promptly, resulting in continued spread of the disease to others.

TB is the leading cause of death among people with HIV, who are about 12 times more likely to develop active TB than people without HIV.

The incidence of TB varies with age. Globally, TB occurs mainly in adults 15 years and older. Men are more likely to be infected than women. There is some evidence that, in countries with a low burden of TB such as Britain, Canada and the US, incidence rates among those 65 and older are consistently higher than in other age groups. A large portion of active TB cases in this age group are thought to be due to the reactivation of previously dormant TB infections.

Globally, Indigenous peoples are disproportionately impacted by TB. Australian Indigenous populations face disproportionately higher TB rates, more than four times those of non-Indigenous Australian-born. In 2023, the rate of TB disease among First Nations in Canada was over 3 times that of the overall Canadian population. Contributing factors are the result of ongoing inequities stemming from historical and ongoing impacts of colonization including isolation from health services, food insecurity, higher prevalence of health conditions such as diabetes, overcrowding, and poverty.

==== Genetics ====
Early case and twin studies have indicated that genetic components are important in host susceptibility to M. Tuberculosis. Genome-wide association studies (GWAS) have identified three genetic risk loci, including at positions 3q23, 11p13 and 18q11. As is common in GWAS, the variants discovered have moderate effect sizes - but have shown that TB has high polygenic heritability. These studies suggest that while only a handful of alleles have been found, larger well designed studies may find more.

==== Close contact ====
Prolonged, frequent, or close contact with people who have active TB is a high risk factor for becoming infected; this group includes health care workers and children where a family member is infected. Transmission is most likely to occur from only people with active TB – those with latent infection are not thought to be contagious. Environmental risk factors that put a person in closer contact with infectious droplets from a person infected with TB are overcrowding, poor ventilation, or proximity to a potentially infectious person.

==== Environmental factors ====
Environmental factors which weaken the body's protective mechanisms and may put a person at additional risk of contracting TB include air pollution, exposure to smoke (including tobacco smoke), and exposure (often occupational) to dust or particulates.

==== Immunodeficiency ====
Tuberculosis patients with hiv share

The most important risk factor for developing active TB is concurrent human immunodeficiency virus (HIV) infection; in 2023, 6.1% of those becoming infected with TB were also infected with HIV. Sub-Saharan Africa has a particularly high burden of HIV-associated TB. Of those without HIV infection who are infected with tuberculosis, about 5–15% develop active disease during their lifetimes; in contrast, 30% of those co-infected with HIV develop the active disease.

Another important risk factor is the use of medications that suppress the immune system. These include (but are not limited to), chemotherapy; medication after an organ transplant; and medication for lupus or rheumatoid arthritis. Other risk factors include: heavy alcohol use, diabetes mellitus, silicosis, tobacco smoking, recreational drug use, severe kidney disease, head and neck cancer, and low body weight. Children, especially those under age five, have undeveloped immune systems and are at higher risk.

== Pathogenesis ==
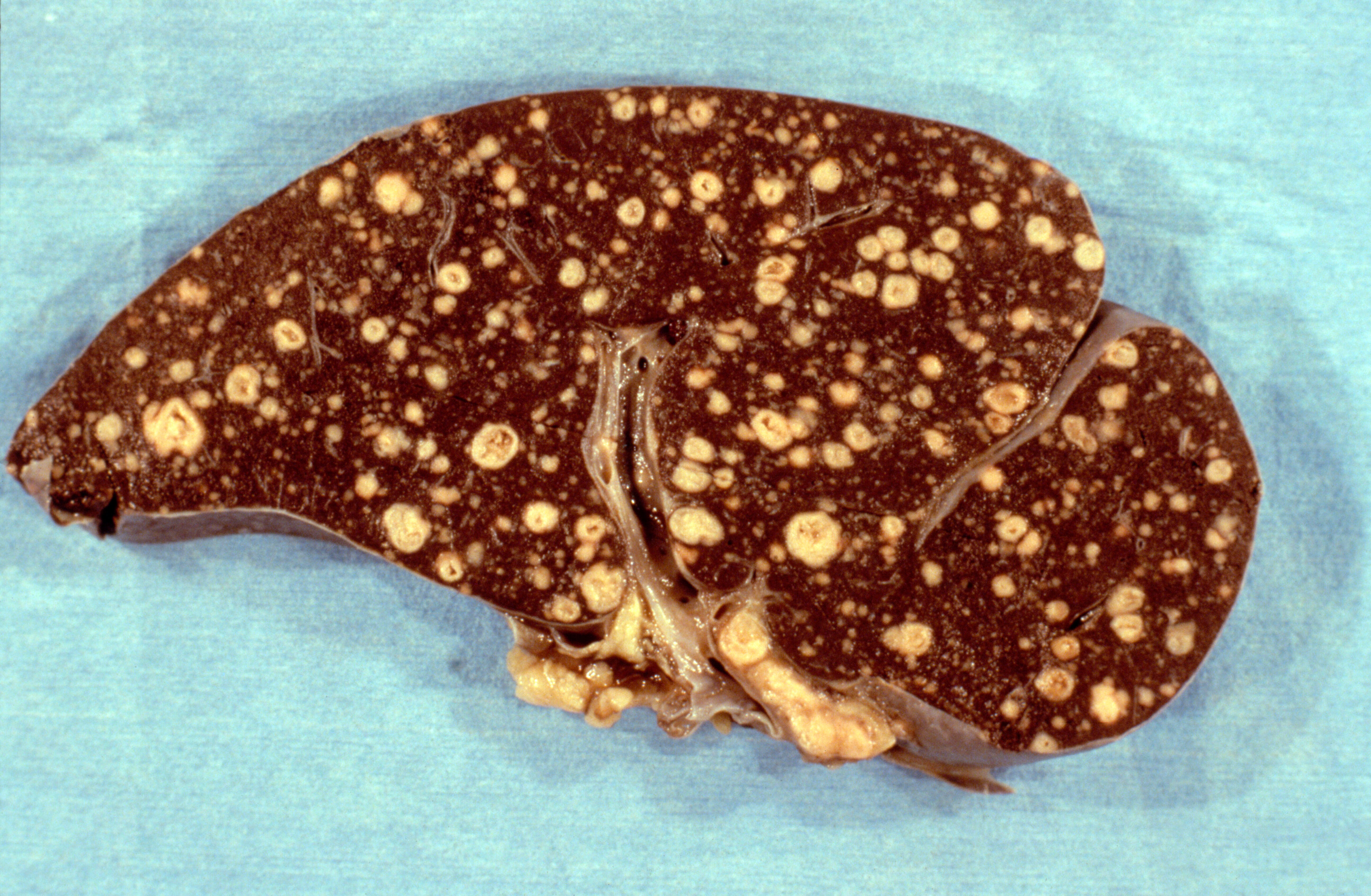
The spleen in a person with miliary tuberculosis showing granulomas (tubercles)

TB infection begins when an M. tuberculosis bacterium, inhaled from the air, penetrates the lungs and reaches the alveoli. Here it encounters an alveolar macrophage, a cell of the body's immune system, which attempts to destroy it. However, M. tuberculosis can neutralise and colonise the macrophage, leading to persistent infection.

The defence mechanism of the macrophage begins when a foreign body, such as a bacterial cell, binds to receptors on the surface of the macrophage. The macrophage then stretches itself around the bacterium and engulfs it. Once inside this macrophage, the bacterium is trapped in a compartment called a phagosome; the phagosome subsequently merges with a lysosome to form a phagolysosome. The lysosome is an organelle which contains digestive enzymes; these are released into the phagolysosome and kill the invader.

The M. tuberculosis bacterium can subvert the normal process by inhibiting phagosome development and preventing fusion with the lysosome. The bacterium can survive and replicate within the phagosome; it will eventually destroy its host macrophage, releasing progeny bacteria which spread the infection.

In the next stage of infection, macrophages, epithelioid cells, lymphocytes and fibroblasts aggregate to form a granuloma, which surrounds and isolates the infected macrophages. This does not destroy the tuberculosis bacilli, but contains them, preventing spread of the infection to other parts of the body. They are nevertheless able to survive within the granuloma. In tuberculosis, the granuloma contains necrotic tissue at its center, and appears as a small white nodule, also known as a tubercle, from which the disease derives its name.

Granulomas are most common in the lung, but they can appear anywhere in the body. As long as the infection is contained within granulomas, there are no outward symptoms and the infection is latent. However, if the immune system is unable to control the infection, the disease can progress to active TB, which can cause significant damage to the lungs and other organs.

If TB bacteria gain entry to the blood stream from an area of damaged tissue, they can spread throughout the body and set up many foci of infection, all appearing as tiny, white tubercles in the tissues. This severe form of TB disease, most common in young children and those with HIV, is called miliary tuberculosis. People with this disseminated TB have a high fatality rate even with treatment (about 30%).

In many people, the infection waxes and wanes. Tissue destruction and necrosis are often balanced by healing and fibrosis. Affected tissue is replaced by scarring and cavities filled with caseous necrotic material. During active disease, some of these cavities connect to the air passages (bronchi), and this material can be coughed up. It contains living bacteria and thus can spread the infection. Treatment with appropriate antibiotics kills bacteria and allows healing to take place. Upon cure, affected areas are eventually replaced by scar tissue.

== Diagnosis ==
Diagnosis of tuberculosis is often difficult. Symptoms manifest slowly and are generally non-specific, e.g., cough, fatigue, fever, which have many possible causes. The conclusive test for pulmonary TB is a bacterial culture taken from a sample of sputum, but this is slow to give a result, and does not detect latent TB. Extra-pulmonary TB infection can affect the kidneys, spine, brain, lymph nodes, or bones—a sample cannot easily be obtained for culture. Tests based on the immune response are sensitive but are likely to give false negatives in those with weak immune systems such as very young patients and those coinfected with HIV. Another issue affecting diagnosis in many parts of the world is that TB infection is most common in resource-poor settings where sophisticated laboratories are rarely available.

TB should be considered in those with signs of lung disease or constitutional symptoms lasting longer than two weeks. Diagnosis of TB, whether latent or active, starts with medical history and physical examination. Subsequently several tests can be performed to confirm the diagnosis: A chest X-ray and multiple sputum cultures for acid-fast bacilli are typically part of the evaluation.

The share of tuberculosis tests that are positive

Sites providing rapid tuberculosis diagnostics per million people

=== Mantoux test ===
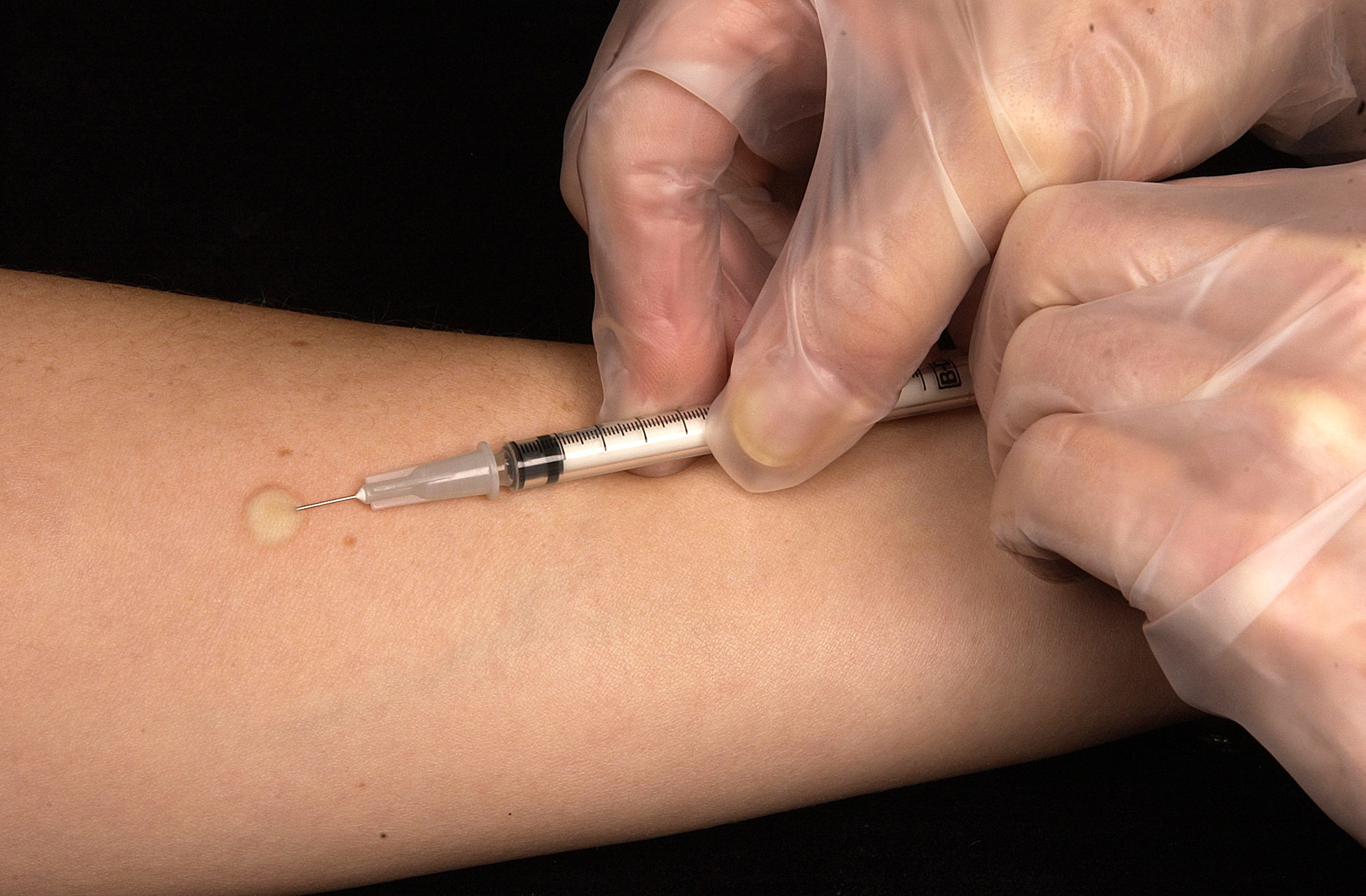
The Mantoux skin test consists of an injection of a small quantity of PPD tuberculin just below the skin on the forearm.

The Mantoux tuberculin skin test is often used to screen people at high risk for TB, such as healthcare workers or close contacts of TB patients, who may not display symptoms of infection. In the Mantoux test, a small quantity of tuberculin antigen is injected intradermally on the forearm. The result of the test is read after 48 to 72 hours. A person who has been exposed to the bacteria would be expected to mount an immune response; the reaction is read by measuring the diameter of the raised area. Vaccination with bacillus Calmette–Guérin (BCG) may result in a false-positive result. Several factors may lead to false negatives; these include HIV infection, some viral illnesses, and overwhelming TB disease.

=== Interferon-gamma release assay ===
In some testing strategies, the Interferon Gamma Release Assay (IGRA) is used as a follow-up test for those who are positive to the Mantoux test, to increase specificity in people who have received the BCG vaccine. This test mixes a blood sample with antigenic material derived from the TB bacterium. If the patient has developed an immune response to a TB infection, white blood cells in the sample will release interferon-gamma (IFN-γ), which can be measured. This test is more reliable than the Mantoux test, and does not give a false positive after BCG vaccination; however it may give a positive result in case of infection by the related bacteria M. szulgai, M. marinum, and M. kansasii.

=== Chest radiograph ===
In active pulmonary TB, infiltrates (opaque areas) or scarring are visible in the lungs on a chest X-ray. Infiltrates are suggestive but not necessarily diagnostic of TB. Other lung diseases can mimic the appearance of TB, and this test will not detect extrapulmonary infection or a recent infection.

=== Microbiological studies ===
A definitive diagnosis of tuberculosis can be made by detecting Mycobacterium tuberculosis organisms in a specimen taken from the patient (most often sputum, but may also be pus, cerebrospinal fluid, biopsied tissue, etc.). The specimen is examined by fluorescence microscopy. The bacterium is slow growing, so a cell culture may take several weeks to yield a result.

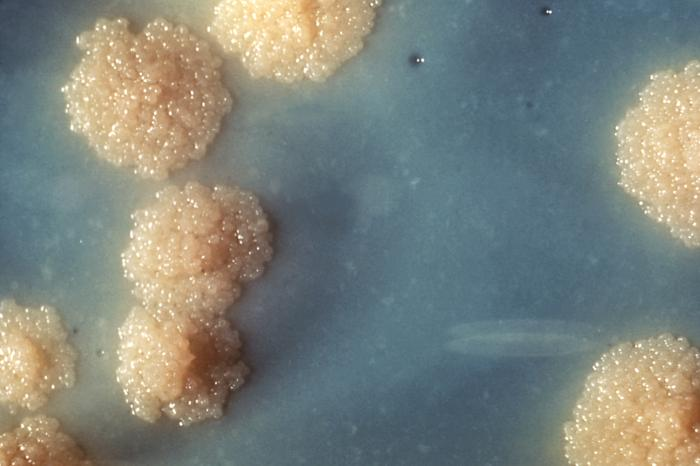
A close-up of Mycobacterium tuberculosis in a culture medium

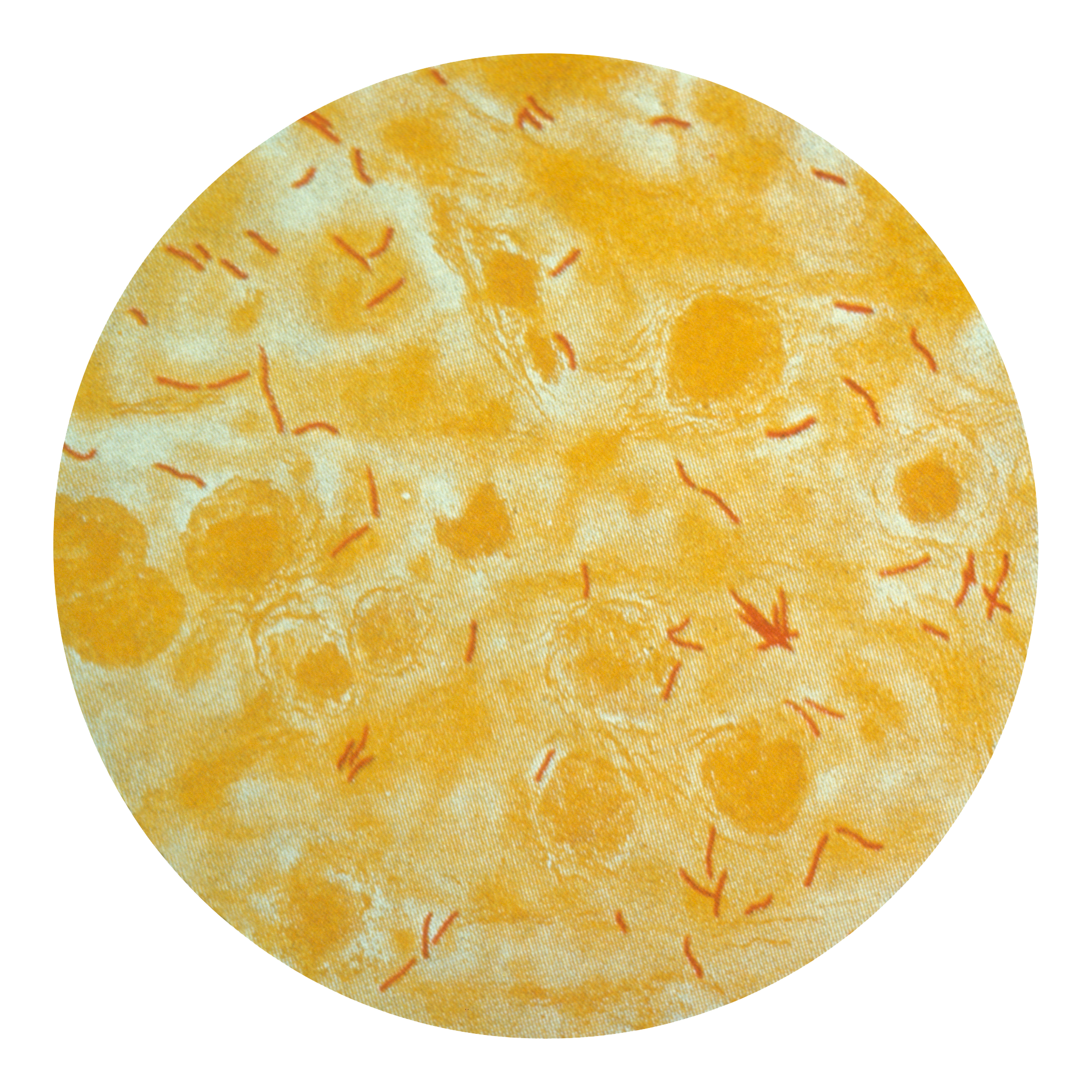
M. tuberculosis (stained red) in sputum

=== Other tests ===
Nucleic acid amplification tests (NAATs) can provide rapid diagnosis of tuberculosis. WHO recommends rapid molecular diagnostic tests as initial tests for people with signs and symptoms of TB. In December 2010, the World Health Organization endorsed the Xpert MTB/RIF system, a NAAT, for rapid diagnosis of tuberculosis, particularly in countries most affected by the disease.

Commercial serological tests that detect antibodies against Mycobacterium tuberculosis are not recommended for diagnosing active tuberculosis because of inconsistent and imprecise diagnostic performance, including false-positive and false-negative results.

For extrapulmonary tuberculosis, molecular WHO-recommended rapid diagnostic tests may be used with appropriate specimens, including lymph-node tissue aspirates, pleural tissue or fluid, synovial fluid, peritoneal fluid and pericardial fluid, depending on the site of disease. Urine-based molecular testing may also be used in selected people with suspected extrapulmonary tuberculosis, although diagnostic performance varies and results should be interpreted in the clinical context.

== Prevention ==
The main strategies to prevent infection with TB are treatment of both active and latent TB, as well as vaccination of children who are at risk.

Although latent TB is not infectious, it should be treated to prevent its development into active pulmonary TB, which is infectious. The cascade of person-to-person spread can be circumvented by segregating those with active ("overt") TB and putting them on anti-TB drug regimens. After about two weeks of effective treatment, subjects with nonresistant active infections generally do not remain contagious to others; however, it is important to complete the full course of treatment, which is usually six months.

=== Vaccines ===
BCG immunization coverage for TB among 1 year olds

The only available vaccine as of 2025 is bacillus Calmette-Guérin (BCG). In areas where tuberculosis is not common, only children at high risk are typically immunized, while suspected cases of tuberculosis are individually tested for and treated. In countries where tuberculosis is common, one dose is recommended in healthy babies as soon after birth as possible. A single dose is given by intradermal injection. Administered to children under 5, it decreases the risk of getting the infection by 20% and the risk of infection turning into active disease by nearly 60%. It is not effective in adults.

=== Public health ===
The first International Congress on Tuberculosis was held at Berlin in 1899. It was known by this time that tuberculosis was caused by a bacillus, thought to be passed by phlegm coughed up by a sick person, dried into dust, and then inhaled by a healthy person. Milk was known to be an important means of infection. Means of prevention included free ventilation of houses and wholesome and abundant food. Milk should be boiled, and meat should be carefully inspected, or else the cattle should be tested for infection. Cures for the disease included abundant food, particularly fatty foods, and life in the open air.

Similar anti-spitting campaigns took hold elsewhere: in the United States, concern about the spread of tuberculosis played a role in the movement to prohibit public spitting except into spittoons.

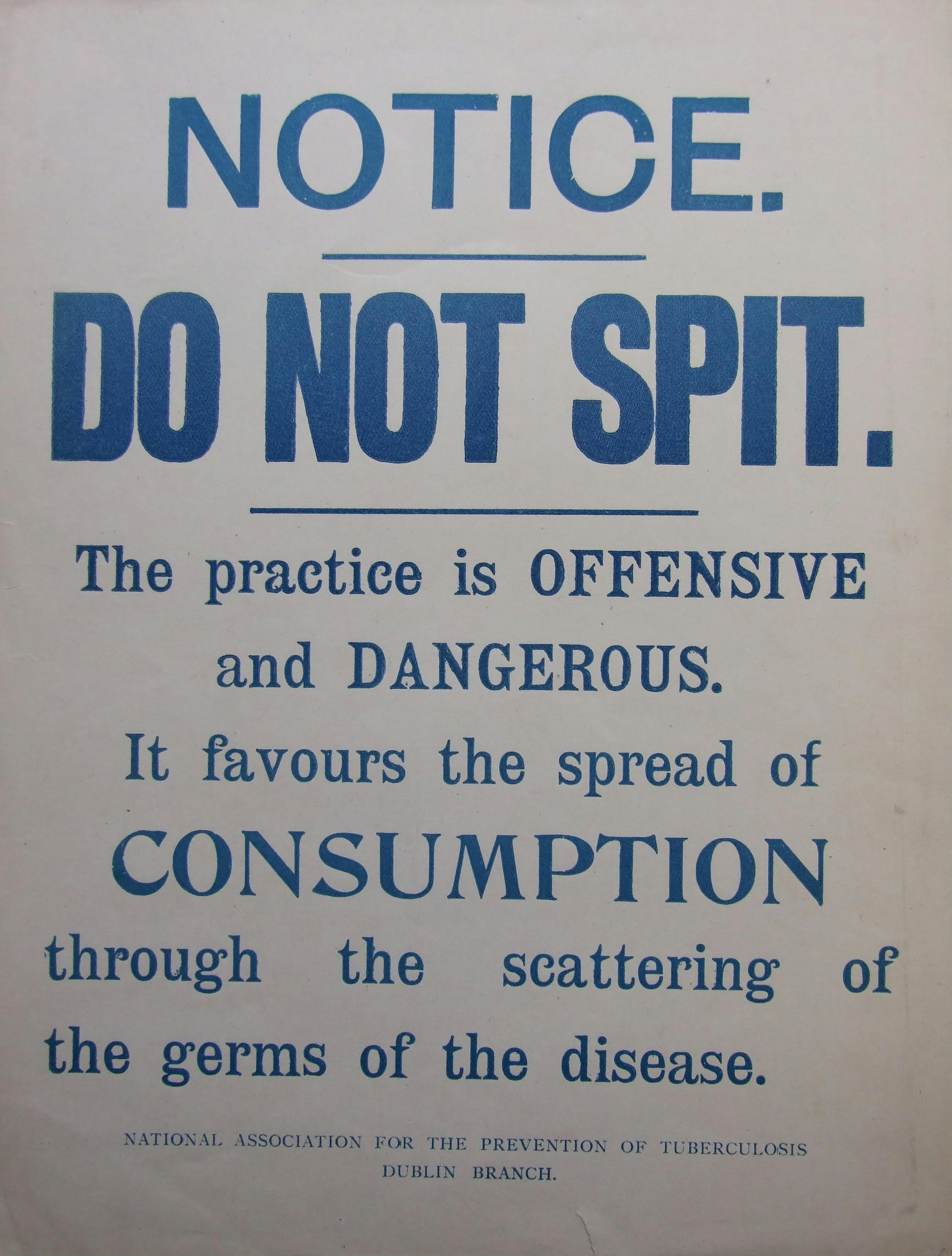
A tuberculosis public health campaign in Ireland, 1905

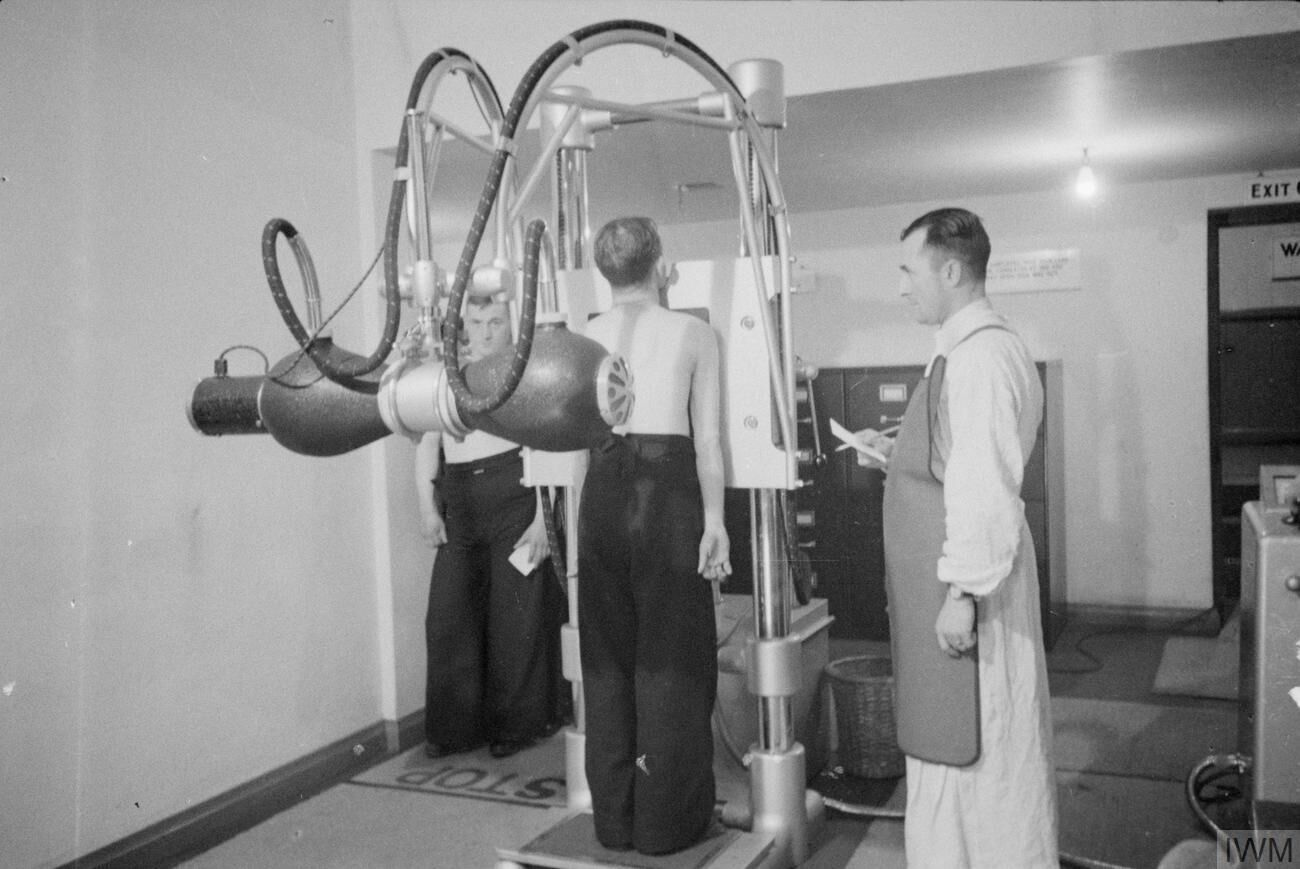
Royal Navy sailors being screened for tuberculosis (1940)

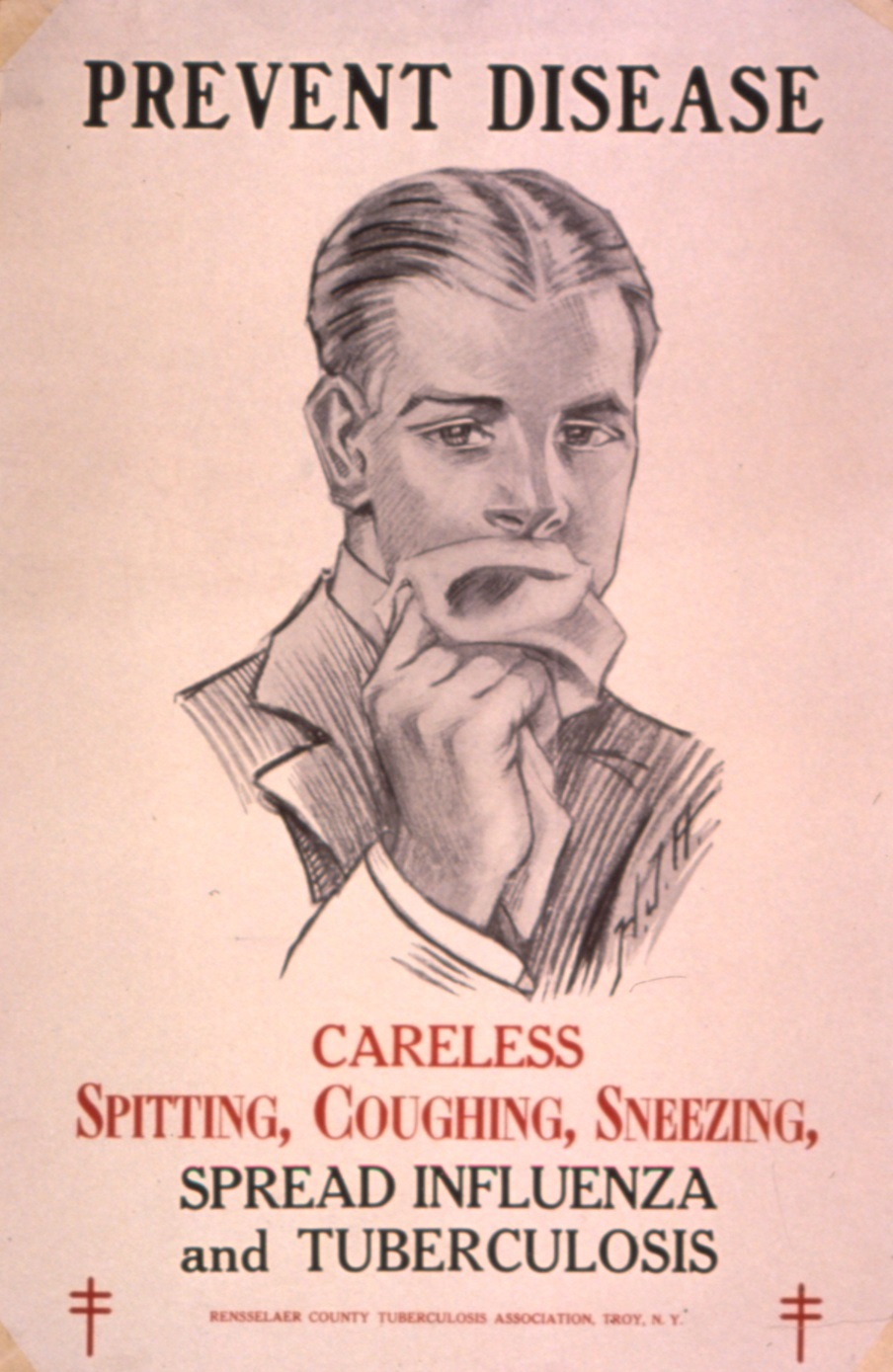
Public health campaigns in the 1920s tried to halt the spread of TB.

==== Campaigns ====
The World Health Organization (WHO) declared TB a "global health emergency" in 1993, and in 2006, the Stop TB Partnership developed a Global Plan to Stop Tuberculosis, which aimed to save 14 million lives between its launch and 2015. Several targets they set were not achieved by 2015, mostly due to the increase in HIV-associated tuberculosis and the emergence of multidrug-resistant tuberculosis.

In 2014, the WHO adopted the "End TB" strategy which aims to reduce TB incidence by 80% and TB deaths by 90% by 2030. The strategy contains a milestone to reduce TB incidence by 20% and TB deaths by 35% by 2020. However, by 2020 only a 9% reduction in incidence per population was achieved globally, with the European region achieving 19% and the African region achieving 16% reductions. Similarly, the number of deaths only fell by 14%, missing the 2020 milestone of a 35% reduction, with some regions making better progress (31% reduction in Europe and 19% in Africa). Treatment, prevention, and funding milestones were also missed in 2020; for example, only 6.3 million people began TB preventive treatment, far short of the 30 million target.

The goal of tuberculosis elimination is being hampered by the lack of rapid testing, short and effective treatment courses, and completely effective vaccines.

==== Global programs ====
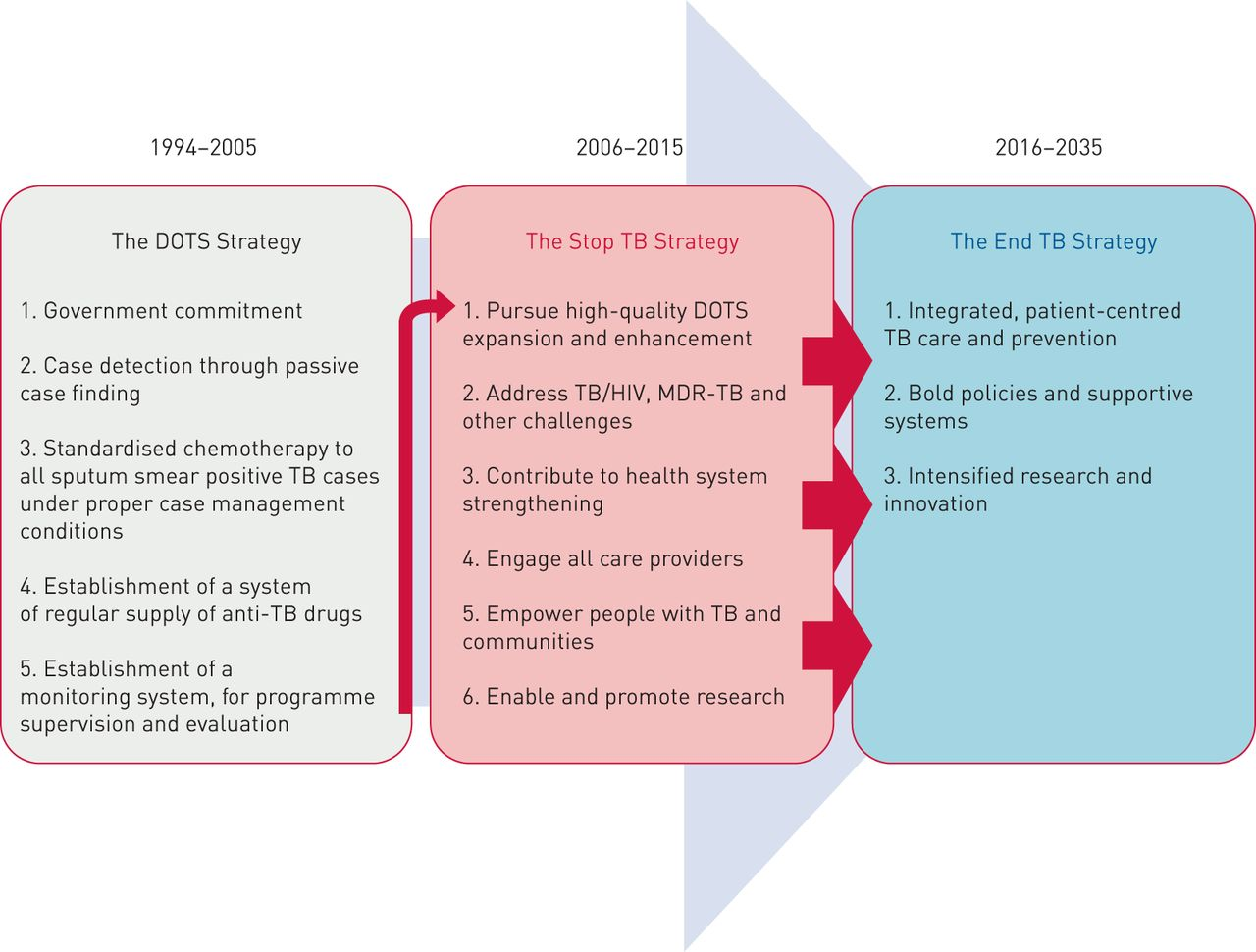
Between 1995 and 2015, the World Health Organization formulated 3 strategies for the control and ultimately the elimination of tuberculosis, with a target date of 2035. This diagram charts how these are linked and build on each other.

The World Health Organization has formulated and promoted several strategies to combat TB globally. The first of these, launched in 1995, was DOTS (Directly Observed Treatment, Short-course), which promoted a standard course of treatment together with the appropriate resources and state support. The DOTS program, implemented by the member nations of the World Health Organization, led to significant reductions in TB incidence and mortality by improving case detection and treatment success rates.

In 2006, WHO adopted the Stop TB Strategy which implemented millennium development goal 6c (by 2015, to halt and reverse the incidence of major diseases). This included and continued the DOTS program, with additional emphasis on sustainable financing, improved technology, and improved emphasis on drug resistance and HIV co-infection. This program ran from 2006 (when TB incidence was estimated at 8.8 million new cases) to 2014, when TB incidence was estimated at 9.6 million new cases.

The Stop TB Strategy was followed in 2014 by the End TB Strategy. This sets targets of a 90% reduction in TB deaths and 80% reduction in TB incidence by 2030, followed by reductions of 95% and 90%, respectively, by 2035. A third target is that no TB-affected households experience catastrophic costs due to the disease by 2020. This incorporated the principles of the previous strategies, while introducing objectives for prevention based on the identification and treatment of individuals with latent TB infection.

In 2012, The World Health Organization (WHO), the Bill and Melinda Gates Foundation, and the US government subsided a fast-acting diagnostic tuberculosis test, Xpert MTB/RIF, for use in low- and middle-income countries. This is a rapid molecular test used to diagnose TB and simultaneously detect rifampicin resistance. It provides results in about 2 hours, which is much faster than traditional TB culture methods. The test is designed for use with the GeneXpert System.

== Treatment ==
Percentage of cases detected and treated

The antibiotic drugs used for treating TB are generally classified as either first-line or second-line. Treatment with a combination of first-line drugs (isoniazid, rifampicin, pyrazinamide, and ethambutol) is preferred; they are more effective, and have fewer side effects. Second-line drugs are used if a person's TB infection either develops resistance to one or more first-line drugs, or if the infection comprises a drug-resistant strain. The second-line drugs are generally less effective, have more severe side effects, and must be taken over a longer period of time.

=== Drug susceptible ===
An infection is drug-susceptible if it has no resistance to the first-line drugs. To prevent tuberculosis from developing drug resistance, the recommended treatment regimens combine four drugs. These should be taken over a period of 4 or 6 months. The 6 month regime, known by the acronym HRZE, comprises all four first-line drugs (isoniazid (H), rifampicin (R), pyrazinamide (Z), and ethambutol (E)) taken daily for two months, followed by just the H and R drugs for the remaining four months. Evidence indicates that it is highly effective if followed through properly. The four-month regime, known by the acronym HMPZ, has moderate evidence of effectiveness and several contra-indications. For the first 2 months, four drugs are taken (isoniazid (H), rifapentine (P), moxifloxacin (M), and pyrazinamide (Z)); followed by two more months with the H, P, and M components.

=== Drug-resistant ===
A particular issue with TB treatment arises when an infection is resistant to one or more of the treatment drugs. If first-line treatment does not work for a patient, then the infection should undergo drug susceptibility testing (DST) to develop a tailored second-line treatment regimen which will be more effective. Historically, treatment regimens for multidrug-resistant (MDR-TB) have required multiple drugs taken over long periods—between 18 and 24 months. The expense, duration, and adverse effects of these treatments mean many patients did not complete the course.

As of 2025, WHO recommends two shorter 6-month regimens and two 9-month regimens for DR-TB and MDR-TB using a combination of second-line drugs taken orally; all have good evidence of effectiveness. The 6-month regimens are known by the acronyms BPaLM and BDLLfx:

- BPaLM (bedaquiline, pretomanid, linezolid, moxifloxacin).
- BDLLfxC (bedaquiline, delamanid, and linezolid in combination with either levofloxacin (Lfx) or clofazimine (C))

=== Adherence and support ===
It can be difficult for patients to adhere to their TB treatment regimen. Several drugs must be taken daily for a long period, often with unpleasant side effects. There is often a rapid improvement in symptoms, so that patients stop taking medication even though the infection is still active and likely to reassert symptoms after a period. In areas without public health systems, prolonged treatment is expensive. Failure to complete a course of treatment can result in the emergence of drug-resistant tuberculosis.

Public health bodies recommend supporting patients during the treatment period. One form of support is directly observed therapy—a healthcare worker watches the TB patient swallow the drugs, either in person or online. Other forms of support include having an assigned case manager, digital monitoring, health education, counseling, and community support.

== Prognosis ==
Tuberculosis death rates

Tuberculosis is generally curable with prompt and appropriate treatment, but can be fatal if left untreated. The prognosis depends on factors like disease stage, drug resistance, and a person's overall health. While treatment is effective, delays or inadequate treatment can lead to severe illness and death.

Without treatment, about two-thirds of people with TB will die of the disease, usually within three years of diagnosis.

Progression from TB infection to overt TB disease occurs when the bacilli overcome the immune system defenses and begin to multiply. In some 1–5% of cases, this occurs soon after the initial infection. However, in the majority of cases, a latent infection occurs with no obvious symptoms. Over an individual's lifetime, these dormant bacilli produce active tuberculosis in 5–10% of these latent cases, often many years after infection.

The risk of reactivation increases in those whose immune system becomes weakened, such as may be caused by certain drug treatments, or by infection with HIV. In people coinfected with M. tuberculosis and HIV, the risk of reactivation increases to 10% per year.

Tuberculosis (TB) prognosis is significantly worsened by HIV co-infection, leading to higher mortality rates and poorer treatment outcomes. People with HIV are much more susceptible to developing active TB, and even with treatment, they face increased risks of unsuccessful treatment and death compared to those without HIV.

Tuberculosis deaths by region, 1990 to 2017

Deaths from tuberculosis, by age

== Epidemiology ==
Reports of tuberculosis can be found throughout recorded history. In Europe, Hippocrates, writing around 400 BCE describes phthisis; in India, the Vedas (composed 1500–1200 BCE) refer to yaksma; both of these are generally equated with tuberculosis. Earlier evidence of tuberculosis has been found in prehistoric human remains in Europe, Africa, Asia, and the Americas, with the earliest dating to the early Neolithic era (approximately 10,000–11,000 years ago).

Phylogenetic analysis of DNA lineages indicates that the ancestors of the tuberculosis bacterium adapted to human hosts in Africa around 70,000 years ago, and spread across the globe with migrating humans.

The World Health Organization estimates that roughly one-quarter of the world's population carry infection with M. tuberculosis (prevalence), with new infections occurring in about 10.7 million people each year (incidence). Most infections with M. tuberculosis do not cause disease, and 90–95% of infections remain asymptomatic.

TB infection disproportionally affects low-income populations and countries. Factors like poverty, inadequate living conditions, and poor nutrition contribute to higher TB prevalence and incidence in these settings. Globally, the highest burden of TB is concentrated in low-income countries.

People living with HIV have a significantly higher risk of developing tuberculosis (TB) compared to those without HIV. HIV weakens the immune system, making individuals more susceptible to TB infection and increasing the likelihood of progression from latent to active TB. TB is also a leading cause of death among people with HIV.

To a certain extent, newly diagnosed TB infections tend to cluster in spring and summer; this is attributed in part to lower vitamin D levels and indoor crowding during the colder seasons, combined with a lag between infection and diagnosis. The strength of seasonality varies with latitude, with stronger patterns observed in regions farther from the equator.

Incidence of tuberculosis

Number of tuberculosis cases

Cases of extensively drug resistant tuberculosis

Cases of multidrug resistant tuberculosis

=== Trends ===
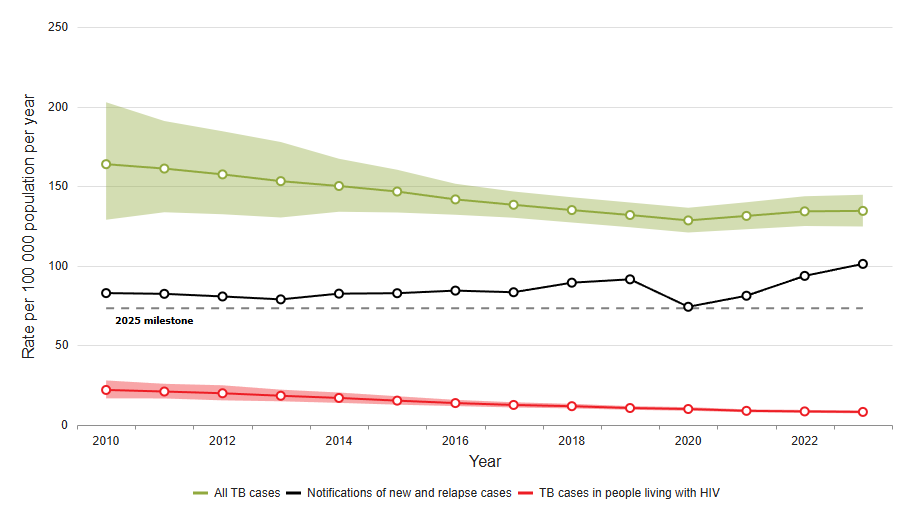
Global tuberculosis rates per 100,000 population, from 2010 to 2023. Shaded areas represent 95% uncertainty intervals.

Since the late 19th century, a combination of improved living conditions and public health measures has resulted in declines in case and mortality rates in Western Europe and North America. This trend accelerated in the 1950s when effective drug treatments first became available. However progress stalled and even reversed in some regions after the 1990s due to factors like drug resistance and the HIV/AIDS pandemic.

Global monitoring of TB incidence is primarily done through annual reports by the World Health Organization (WHO), which has been collecting data and publishing comprehensive reports on the disease since 1997.

=== By country ===
The distribution of tuberculosis is not uniform; it is concentrated in low- and middle-income countries, with high-burden regions including the WHO South-East Asia, African, and Western Pacific regions. High incidence of TB is strongly correlated with poor literacy and sex (male). Hopes of totally controlling the disease have been dramatically dampened because of many factors, including the difficulty of developing an effective vaccine, the expensive and time-consuming diagnostic process, the necessity of many months of treatment, the increase in HIV-associated tuberculosis, and the emergence of drug-resistant cases in the 1980s.

Approximately 87% of new TB cases occur in the 30 high TB burden countries, with more than two-thirds of the global burden occurring in Bangladesh, China, the Democratic Republic of the Congo, India, Indonesia, Nigeria, Pakistan, and the Philippines.

==== India ====
It is estimated that approximately 40% of the population of India carry tuberculosis infection. This is attributed to widespread poverty, malnutrition, overcrowding, and poor hygiene, which facilitate transmission and disease development. Factors like stigma, lack of awareness, delayed diagnosis, and the high financial burden of treatment hinder progress. The emergence of multidrug-resistant TB, together with weak healthcare infrastructure contribute to the persistence of the disease, despite national control programs. Overall, the rate of TB incidence (the annual total of new infections) in India has decreased from nearly 300 per 100,000 population in 2010 to 200 in 2023.

==== Indonesia ====
TB is a major health challenge in Indonesia, with an estimated one million cases annually and around 134,000 deaths each year. Factors contributing to this include a family history of TB, malnutrition, inappropriate ventilation, diabetes mellitus, smoking behavior, and low income level. Incidence of TB infection increased in 2020 and subsequent years; this has been attributed to strain on health systems caused by the COVID-19 pandemic.

==== China ====
The incidence of TB in China has decreased over time, from 67 new cases per 100,000 of population in 2010 to 40 in 2023. TB risk is not uniform across the country, with higher relative risks observed in the poorer western and southwestern regions, such as Xinjiang and Tibet. Quality of care is inconsistent, despite efforts by the Chinese Center for Disease Control and Prevention to improve diagnosis, referral and treatment nationwide.

==== Philippines ====
As of 2023, the Philippines accounts for 6.8% of global TB cases, the 4th worldwide. Cases have increased from 520 per 100,000 people in 2007 to 625 cases per 100,000 in 2024, following a spike in numbers during the COVID-19 pandemic. TB in the Philippines has been linked with poverty, overcrowded living conditions, malnutrition, and health inequities; in addition institutional discrimination and stigma may lead to delayed diagnosis and ongoing transmission.

==== Lesotho ====
Lesotho has an estimated 664 new infections per 100,000 population in 2023. This compares favorably with the figure of 1,184 in 2010. It is still one of the highest TB incidence rates globally. A major factor is the extremely high prevalence of HIV in the adult population (around 23%), with many TB patients being co-infected. Other factors include lack of funding, mountainous territory making access to care difficult, and poor adherence to therapy regimens.

== History ==
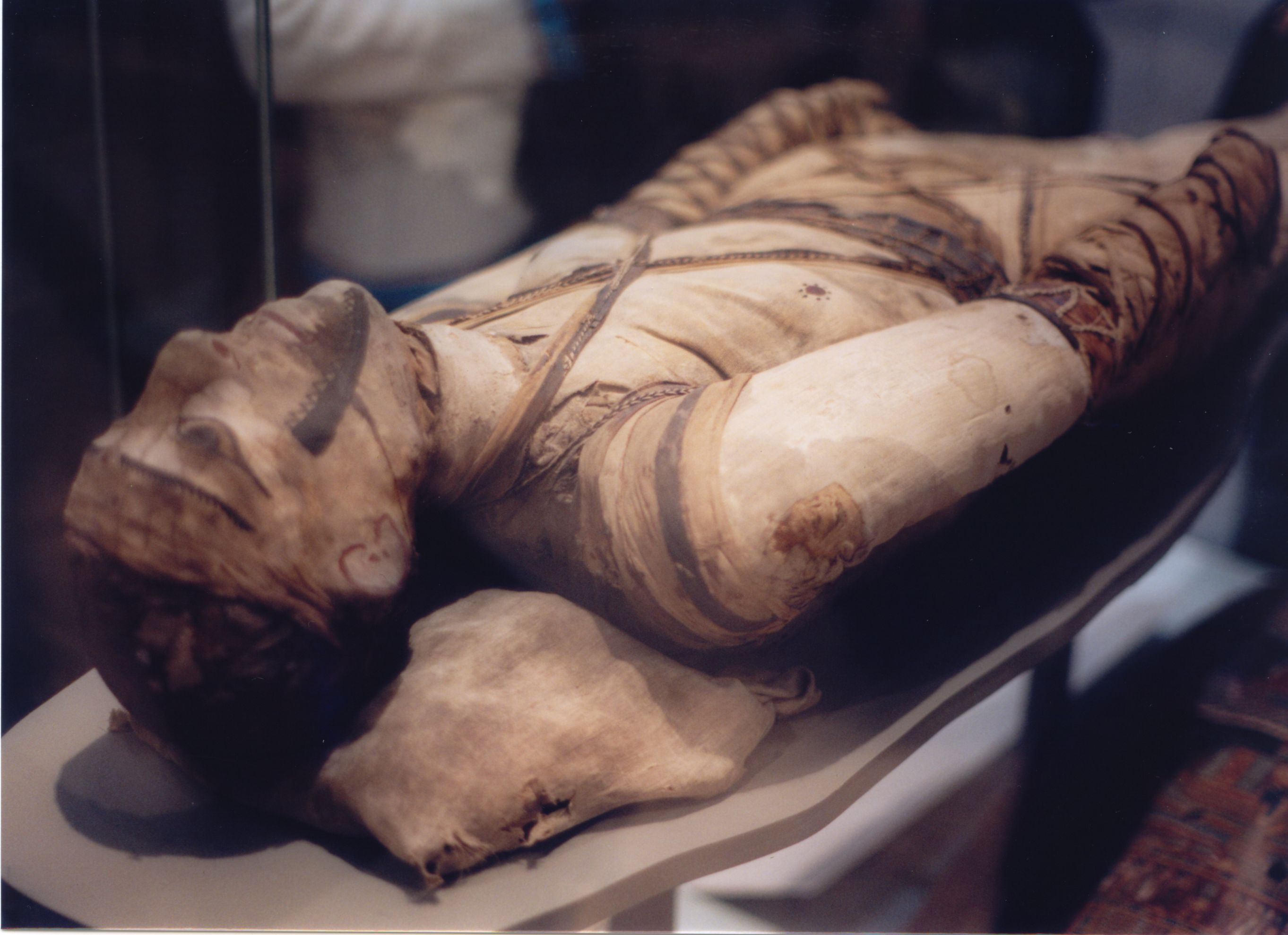
An Egyptian mummy in the British Museum – tubercular decay has been found in the spine.

Tuberculosis has existed since antiquity. Skeletal remains show some prehistoric humans (4000 BC) had TB, and researchers have found tubercular decay in the spines of Egyptian mummies dating from 3000 to 2400 BC. Genetic studies suggest the presence of TB-like bacteria in South America from about AD 140.

=== Identification ===
Although Richard Morton established the pulmonary form associated with tubercles as a pathology in 1689, due to the variety of its symptoms, TB was not identified as a single disease until the 1820s. Benjamin Marten conjectured in 1720 that consumption was caused by microbes that were spread by people living close to each other. In 1819, René Laennec claimed that tubercles were the cause of pulmonary tuberculosis. J. L. Schönlein first published the name "tuberculosis" (German: Tuberkulose) in 1832.

In 1865, Jean Antoine Villemin demonstrated that tuberculosis could be transmitted, via inoculation, from humans to animals and among animals. Villemin's findings were confirmed in 1867 and 1868 by John Burdon-Sanderson.

Robert Koch identified and described the bacillus causing tuberculosis, M. tuberculosis, on 24 March 1882. In 1905, he was awarded the Nobel Prize in Physiology or Medicine for this discovery.

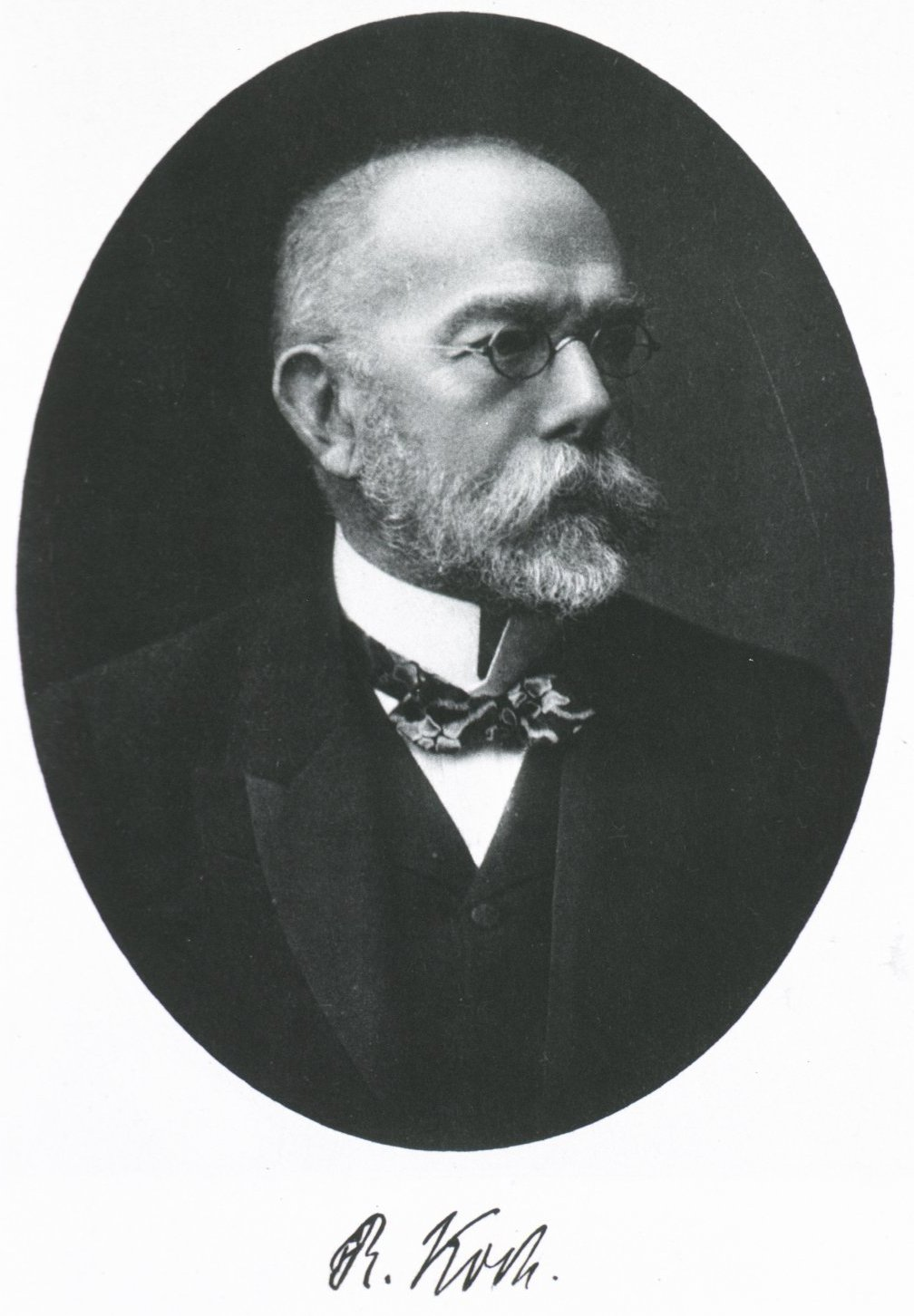
Robert Koch discovered the tuberculosis bacillus.

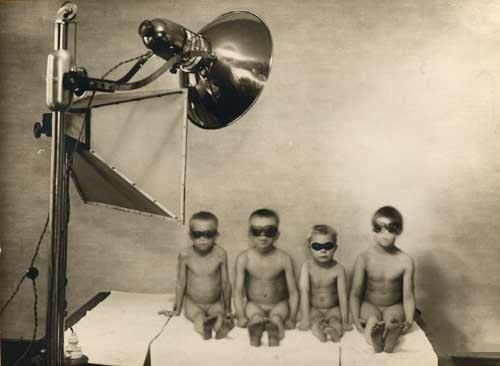
Tuberculosis phototherapy treatment in Kuopio, Finland, 1934

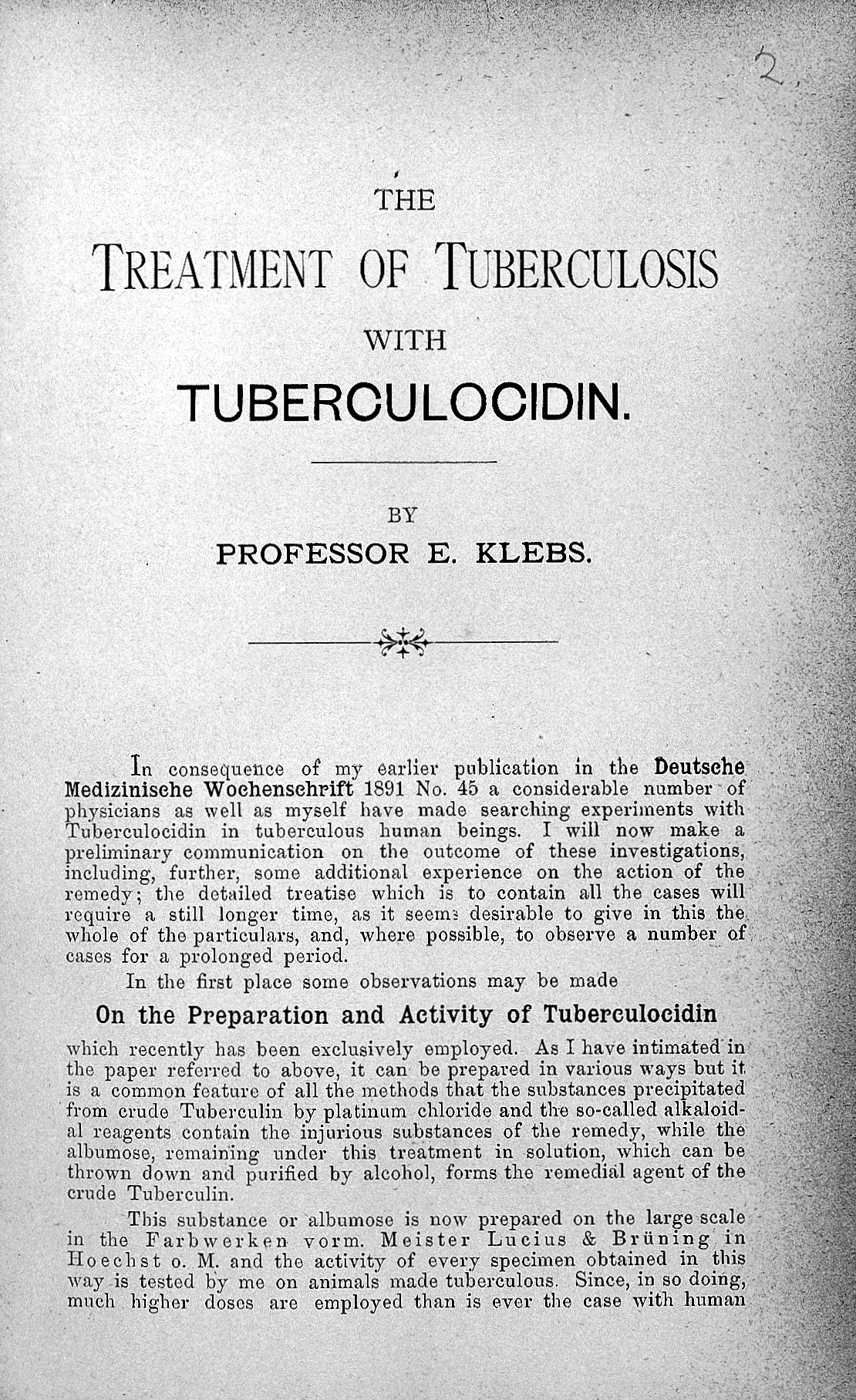
A monograph on the treatment of tuberculosis (dated 1891)

=== Development of treatments ===
In Europe, rates of tuberculosis began to rise in the early 1600s to a peak level in the 1800s, when it caused nearly 25% of all deaths. In the 18th and 19th century, tuberculosis had become epidemic in Europe, showing a seasonal pattern. Tuberculosis caused widespread public concern in the 19th and early 20th centuries as the disease became common among the urban poor. In 1815, one in four deaths in England was due to "consumption." By 1918, TB still caused one in six deaths in France.

Between 1838 and 1845, John Croghan, the owner of Mammoth Cave in Kentucky from 1839 onwards, brought many people with tuberculosis into the cave in the hope of curing the disease with the constant temperature and purity of the cave air; each died within a year.

Hermann Brehmer opened the first TB sanatorium in 1859 in Görbersdorf (now Sokołowsko) in Silesia. After TB was determined to be contagious, in the 1880s, it was put on a notifiable-disease list in Britain. Campaigns started to stop people from spitting in public places, and the infected poor were "encouraged" to enter sanatoria that resembled prisons. The sanatoria for the middle and upper classes offered excellent care and constant medical attention. Whatever the benefits of the "fresh air" and labor in the sanatoria, even under the best conditions, 50% of those who entered died within five years (c. 1916).

Robert Koch did not believe cattle and human tuberculosis were similar, which delayed the recognition of infected milk as a source of infection. During the first half of the 1900s, the risk of transmission from this source was dramatically reduced after the application of the pasteurization process. Koch announced a glycerine extract of the tubercle bacilli as a "remedy" for tuberculosis in 1890, calling it "tuberculin." Although it was not effective, it was later successfully adapted as a screening test for the presence of pre-symptomatic tuberculosis. World Tuberculosis Day is marked on 24 March each year, the anniversary of Koch's original scientific announcement. When the Medical Research Council was formed in Britain in 1913, it initially focused on tuberculosis research.

Albert Calmette and Camille Guérin achieved the first genuine success in immunization against tuberculosis in 1906, using attenuated bovine-strain tuberculosis. It was called bacille Calmette–Guérin (BCG). The BCG vaccine was first used on humans in 1921 in France, but achieved widespread acceptance in the US, Great Britain, and Germany only after World War II.

In 1946, the development of the antibiotic streptomycin following its discovery by Albert Schatz and Selman Waksman made effective treatment and cure of TB a reality. Before the introduction of this medication, the only treatment was surgical intervention, including the "pneumothorax technique", which involved collapsing an infected lung to "rest" it and to allow tuberculous lesions to heal.

By the 1950s, mortality in Europe had decreased by about 90%. Improvements in sanitation, vaccination, and other public-health measures began significantly reducing rates of tuberculosis even before the arrival of streptomycin and other antibiotics, although the disease remained a significant threat.

=== Drug-resistance ===
A graph showing the trend in estimated prevalence (total cases) and incidence (annual new cases) of MDR-TB

A few years after the first antibiotic treatment for TB in 1943, some strains of the TB bacteria developed resistance to the standard drugs (streptomycin, para-aminosalicylic acid, and isoniazid). Between 1970 and 1990, there were numerous outbreaks of drug-resistant tuberculosis involving strains resistant to two or more drugs; these strains are called multi-drug resistant TB (MDR-TB). The resurgence of tuberculosis, caused in part by drug resistance and in part by the HIV pandemic, resulted in the declaration of a global health emergency by the World Health Organization (WHO) in 1993.

Drug resistance to TB can come in two forms: primary and secondary. Primary drug resistance is caused by person-to-person transmission of drug-resistant TB bacteria. Secondary drug resistance (also called acquired resistance) develops during TB treatment. A person with fully drug-susceptible TB may develop secondary (acquired) resistance during therapy because of inadequate treatment, not taking the prescribed regimen appropriately (lack of compliance), or using low-quality drugs.

To fully identify drug resistance and guide treatment, drug susceptibility testing (DST) determines which drugs can kill TB bacteria. WHO guidelines recommend a rapid molecular test, Xpert MTB/RIF, to diagnose TB and simultaneously detect rifampicin resistance. DST is crucial for fully identifying drug resistance and guiding treatment.

Rifampicin-resistant TB (RR-TB) is resistant to the drug rifampicin. Multi-drug resistant tuberculosis (MDR-TB) is defined as resistance to the two most effective first-line TB drugs: rifampicin and isoniazid. Extensively drug-resistant tuberculosis (XDR-TB) is resistant to rifampicin (and may also be resistant to isoniazid), and is also resistant to at least one fluoroquinolone (levofloxacin or moxifloxacin) and to at least one other Group A drug (bedaquiline or linezolid). A further categorization, totally drug resistant tuberculosis, has been used to describe strains with even greater drug resistance. As of 2025, it has no accepted definition, but it is most commonly described as 'resistance to all first- and second-line drugs used to treat TB'. It was first observed in 2003 in Italy, but not widely reported until 2012, and has also been found in Iran, India, and South Africa.

As of 2023, the WHO estimates that 3.2% of new TB infections globally are RR-TB or MDR-TB; this went down from 4.0% in 2015. Among those who have been previously treated for TB, the proportion of people with RR-TB or MDR-TB has also decreased from 25% in 2015 to an estimated 16% in 2023.

Treatment of MDR-TB requires treatment with second-line drugs, which, in general, are less effective, more toxic, and more expensive than first-line drugs. Treatment regimens can run for up to two years, compared to the six months of first-line drug treatment. Treatment of MDR-TB is significantly more costly than treating regular TB. As an example, in the UK in 2013 the cost of standard TB treatment was estimated at £5,000 while the cost of treating MDR-TB was estimated to be more than 10 times greater, ranging from £50,000 to £70,000 per case.

In low-income countries, the impact of MDR-TB on the families of its victims is severe, affecting income, mental health, and social well-being. Families may become impoverished due to the financial strain of MDR-TB treatment, with studies reporting that a significant portion of household income can be spent on healthcare.

== Society and culture ==
=== Names ===
In different ages and cultures, tuberculosis went by many names. Phthisis (φθίσις) in ancient Greek translates to decay or wasting disease, presumed to refer to pulmonary tuberculosis; around 460 BCE, Hippocrates described phthisis as a disease of dry seasons. Tabes in ancient Latin has a similar meaning. Consumption, derived from Latin root con meaning 'completely' with sumere 'to take up from under', was the most common nineteenth-century English word for the disease, and was also in use well into the twentieth century. In The Life and Death of Mr Badman by John Bunyan, the author calls consumption "the captain of all these men of death." "Great white plague" has also been used.

=== Art and literature ===
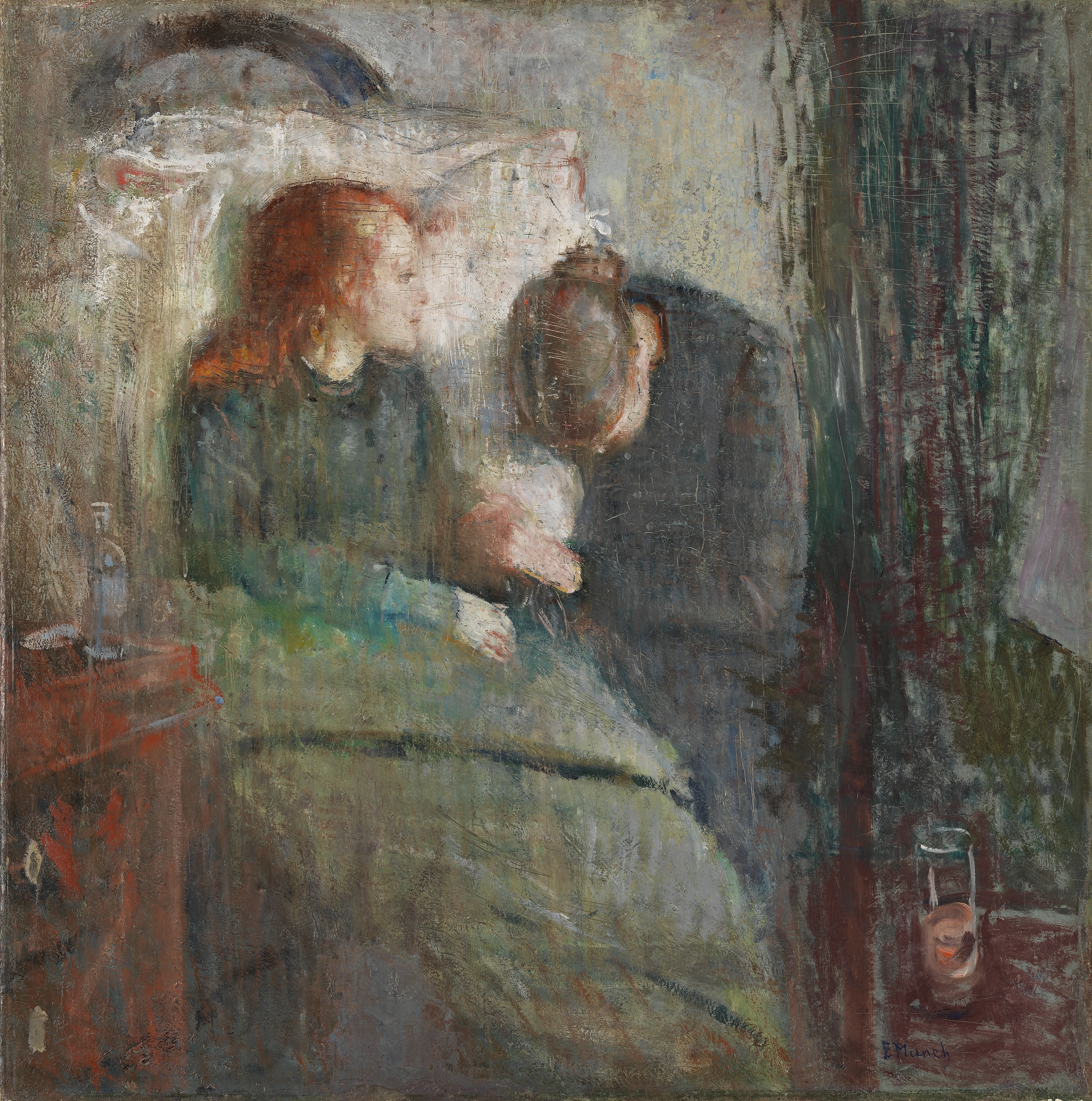
Painting The Sick Child by Edvard Munch, 1885–1886, depicts the illness of his sister Sophie, who died of tuberculosis when Edvard was 14; his mother also died of the disease.

Tuberculosis was for centuries associated with poetic and artistic qualities among those infected, and was also known as "the romantic disease". Major artistic figures such as the poets John Keats, Percy Bysshe Shelley, and Edgar Allan Poe, the composer Frédéric Chopin, the playwright Anton Chekhov, the novelists Franz Kafka, Katherine Mansfield, Charlotte Brontë, Fyodor Dostoevsky, Thomas Mann, W. Somerset Maugham, George Orwell, and Robert Louis Stevenson, and the artists Alice Neel, Jean-Antoine Watteau, Elizabeth Siddal, Marie Bashkirtseff, Edvard Munch, Aubrey Beardsley and Amedeo Modigliani either had the disease or were surrounded by people who did. A widespread belief was that tuberculosis assisted artistic talent. Physical mechanisms proposed for this effect included the slight fever and toxaemia it caused, allegedly helping them to see life more clearly and to act decisively.

Tuberculosis formed an often-reused theme in literature, as in Thomas Mann's The Magic Mountain, set in a sanatorium; in music, as in Van Morrison's song "T.B. Sheets"; in opera, as in Puccini's La bohème and Verdi's La Traviata; in art, as in Munch's painting of his ill sister; and in film, such as the 1945 The Bells of St. Mary's starring Ingrid Bergman as a nun with tuberculosis.

=== Folklore ===
In 19th-century New England, tuberculosis deaths were associated with vampires. When one member of a family died from the disease, the other infected members would lose their health slowly. People believed this was caused by the original person with TB draining the life from the other family members.

=== Law ===
Historically, some countries, including Czech Republic, England, Estonia, Germany, Israel, Norway, Russia and Switzerland had legislation to involuntarily detain or examine those suspected to have tuberculosis, or involuntarily treat them if infected. As of 2025, many countries require TB cases to be notified to a national surveillance organisation (UK, US, European Union.). Many countries make either short term or long term entry visas for potential migrants conditional on a negative TB test.

=== Stigma ===
Tuberculosis stigma is discrimination experienced by many people with TB, which acts as a major barrier to health-seeking, treatment adherence, and overall disease control. Depending on the setting, between 42% and 82% of people with TB report experience of stigma. This prejudice leads to social exclusion, delayed diagnosis, poor adherence to treatment regimens, and thus poor treatment outcomes.

Slow progress in preventing the disease may in part be due to stigma associated with TB. Stigma may result in delays in seeking treatment, lower treatment compliance, and family members keeping diagnosis and cause of death secret – allowing the disease to spread further. Stigma may be due to misconceptions about the disease's transmissibility, cultural myths, association with poverty or (in Africa) HIV/AIDS. Studies in Ghana have found that individuals with TB may be banned from attending public gatherings, and may be assigned junior staff in health facilities. In India, people with TB may lose their job or be unable to marry.

== Research directions ==
As part of the End TB strategy, the WHO has identified four areas where research-based innovations are needed. These are 1) diagnostics, 2) treatment of active TB, 3) treatment of latent TB, and 4) vaccines.

=== Diagnostics ===
Diagnosis of TB infection is difficult, slow, and expensive. This is particularly true of latent TB infection, or infection outside the lungs. Diagnostics can be improved by developing faster, more sensitive tests, preferably based on molecular testing of a blood sample rather than traditional cultivation of a sputum smear; as well as creating ultra-portable diagnostic devices for point-of-care use.

=== Treatment ===
Treatment for TB generally involves taking a cocktail of (sometimes expensive) drugs daily over a period of months. Because the regimen is long and demanding, non-adherence is common, with patients forgetting doses or stopping treatment before completing the course. Shorter and simpler treatment regimens, as well as the introduction of new drugs, have the potential to improve adherence and thus improve outcomes.

There are two specific areas where research can lead to improvements in treatment. The first is the treatment of active tuberculosis, both drug-susceptible and drug-resistant strains. The introduction of safer, easier, and shorter treatment regimens would improve availability and adherence, giving better outcomes. The second area is the treatment and elimination of latent TB infection to prevent it from developing into the active form; again, improved treatment regimens would lead to better outcomes.

Beyond shorter or simpler drug regimens, improving treatment completion also depends on supportive measures such as better health literacy and support structures for people with TB. However, the evidence base for such interventions—particularly among underserved groups in low-incidence countries—remains limited, and further high-quality research is needed.

=== Vaccines ===
Although it was originally developed over a century ago, (Note: The Bacillus Calmette-Guérin (BCG) vaccine was first administered to humans in 1921) as of 2025, BCG remains the only vaccine that is licensed for use; this is despite it having highly variable effectiveness. A promising vaccine candidate, MVA85A, failed in 2019 to demonstrate effectiveness in clinical trials. There is an urgent need for improved vaccines, which could be effective both before exposure to TB and also post exposure.

=== Other areas ===
Fundamental research needs to continue into topics such as the interaction between the bacterium and its human host, details of the chain of steps which culminate in TB transmission, and the social and political obstacles to effective implementation of the elimination strategy.

== Other animals ==
Members of the genus Mycobacterium infect many different animals, including birds, fish, rodents, and reptiles. The species Mycobacterium tuberculosis, though, is rarely present in wild animals. An effort to eradicate bovine tuberculosis caused by Mycobacterium bovis from the cattle and deer herds of New Zealand has been relatively successful. Efforts in Great Britain have been less successful.

As of 2015, M. tuberculosis disease appears to be widespread among captive elephants in the US. It is believed that the animals originally acquired the disease from humans, a process called reverse zoonosis. Because the disease can spread through the air to infect both humans and other animals, it is a public health concern affecting circuses and zoos.

Transmission of both M. bovis and M. tuberculosis between humans and cattle has been documented. Diagnostic challenges complicate control efforts, as commonly used nucleic acid amplification tests cannot reliably distinguish between members of the M. tuberculosis complex, and infections with M. bovis are resistant to the first-line drug pyrazinamide.

== See also ==
- Post-tuberculosis lung disease
- List of deaths due to tuberculosis
- Bibliography of tuberculosis
- International Congress on Tuberculosis

== Sources ==
- Maxwell SH, Pye-Smith PH (1899), Copy of report of the delegates of Her Majesty's Government at the International Congress on Tuberculosis, held at Berlin on the 24th to the 27th May 1899, Printed for H.M.S.O. by Wyman and Sons, archived from the original on 3 July 2025
