= Caplin =

Caplin may refer to:

== Animals ==
- Capelin, a small forage fish also known as a caplin

== People ==
- Alfred Gerald Caplin, better known as Al Capp (1909–1979), American cartoonist and humorist
- Andrew Caplin (born 1956), British-American economist
- Arnold S. Caplin (born 1929), American record producer
- Carole Caplin (born 1962), British health and wellness advisor and writer
- Elliot Caplin (1913–2000), American comic strip writer
- Ivor Caplin (born 1958), British politician
- Jean Caplin (1930–2014), British swimmer
- Lara Molins Caplin (born 1980), Irish cricketer
- Lee Caplin (born 1946), American entertainment executive
- Mortimer Caplin (1916–2019), American lawyer and educator
- Nathan Caplin (1891–1923), American gangster
- Nicholas Caplin (born 1958), former British Army officer
- Paul Caplin (born 1959), British entrepreneur and businessman
- Robert Caplin (born 1983), American photographer and cinematographer
- Roxey Ann Caplin (1793–1888), British writer and inventor
- Ruth Sacks Caplin (1904–2014), American screenwriter
- Sarah Caplin (born 1954), British television producer
- Tony Caplin (born 1951), British businessman
- William Caplin (born 1948), American music theorist

== Places ==
- Caplin Bay, a natural bay in Newfoundland and Labrador, Canada
- Caplin Cove, Newfoundland and Labrador, Canada, a community

== See also ==
- Chaplin (disambiguation)
- Coplin (disambiguation)
