= BCG vaccine =

Vaccine primarily used against tuberculosis

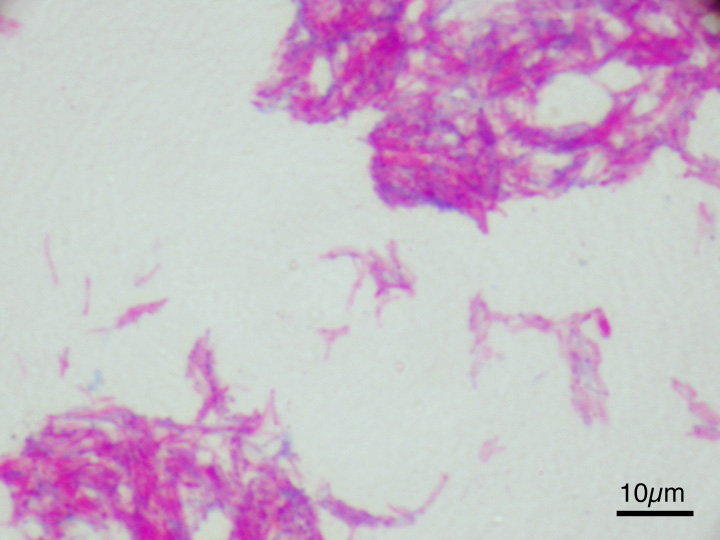
- Microscopic image of the Calmette–Guérin bacillus, Ziehl–Neelsen stain, magnification: 1,000nn

Vaccine description
- Target: Mycobacterium tuberculosis
- Vaccine type: Attenuated

Clinical data
- Trade names: BCG Vaccine, BCG Vaccine AJV
- AHFS/Drugs.com: Professional Drug Facts
- MedlinePlus: a682809
- License data: US DailyMed: BCG Vaccine
- Routes of administration: Percutaneous, intravesical, intradermal
- ATC code: J07AN01 (WHO) L03AX03 (WHO)

Legal status
- Legal status: AU: S4 (Prescription only); CA: ℞-only / Schedule D; UK: POM (Prescription only); US: ℞-only; JP: Rx-only

Identifiers
- DrugBank: DB12768
- ChemSpider: none
- UNII: 8VJE55B0VG; 5H5854UBMZ
- KEGG: D03063; D06466

The Bacillus Calmette–Guérin (BCG) vaccine is a vaccine primarily used against tuberculosis (TB). It is named after its inventors Albert Calmette and Camille Guérin. In countries where tuberculosis or leprosy is common, one dose is recommended in healthy babies as soon after birth as possible. In areas where tuberculosis is not common, only children at high risk are typically immunized, while suspected cases of tuberculosis are individually tested for and treated. Adults who are frequently exposed to tuberculosis may also be immunized. BCG has some effectiveness against Buruli ulcer infection and other nontuberculous mycobacterial infections. It is also often used as part of the treatment of bladder cancer.

Rates of protection against tuberculosis infection vary widely and protection lasts up to 20 years. Among children, it prevents about 20% from getting infected and among those who do get infected, it protects half from developing disease. The vaccine is injected into the skin. No evidence shows that additional doses are beneficial.

Serious side effects are rare. Redness, swelling, and mild pain often occur at the injection site. A small ulcer may also form with some scarring after healing. Side effects are more common and potentially more severe in those with immunosuppression. Although no harmful effects on the fetus have been observed, there is insufficient evidence about the safety of BCG vaccination during pregnancy. Therefore, the vaccine is not recommended for use during pregnancy. The vaccine was originally developed from Mycobacterium bovis, which is commonly found in cattle. Although it has been weakened, it is still live.

The BCG vaccine was first used medically in 1921. It is on the World Health Organization's List of Essential Medicines. As of 2004, the vaccine is given to about 100 million children per year globally. However, it is not commonly administered in the United States.

== Medical uses ==
BCG immunization coverage for TB among 1 year olds

=== Tuberculosis ===
The main use of BCG is for vaccination against tuberculosis. BCG vaccine can be administered after birth intradermally. BCG vaccination can cause a false positive Mantoux test.

The most controversial aspect of BCG is the variable efficacy found in different clinical trials, which appears to depend on geography. Trials in the UK consistently show a 60 to 80% protective effect. Still, those trials conducted elsewhere have shown no protective effect, and efficacy appears to fall the closer one gets to the equator.

A 1994 systematic review found that BCG reduces the risk of getting tuberculosis by about 50%. Differences in effectiveness depend on region, due to factors such as genetic differences in the populations, changes in environment, exposure to other bacterial infections, and conditions in the laboratory where the vaccine is grown, including genetic differences between the strains being cultured and the choice of growth medium.

A systematic review and meta-analysis conducted in 2014 demonstrated that the BCG vaccine reduced infections by 19–27% and reduced progression to active tuberculosis by 71%. The studies included in this review were limited to those that used interferon gamma release assay.

The duration of protection of BCG is not clearly known. In those studies showing a protective effect, the data are inconsistent. The MRC study showed protection waned to 59% after 15 years and to zero after 20 years; however, a study looking at Native Americans immunized in the 1930s found evidence of protection even 60 years after immunization, with only slightly waning in efficacy.

BCG seems to have its greatest effect in preventing miliary tuberculosis or tuberculosis meningitis, so it is still extensively used even in countries where efficacy against pulmonary tuberculosis is negligible.

The 100th anniversary of the BCG vaccine was in 2021. It remains the only vaccine licensed against tuberculosis, which is an ongoing pandemic. Tuberculosis elimination is a goal of the World Health Organization (WHO). The development of new vaccines with greater efficacy against adult pulmonary tuberculosis may be needed to make substantial progress.

==== Efficacy ====
Several possible reasons for the variable efficacy of BCG in different countries have been proposed. None has been proven, some have been disproved, and none can explain the lack of efficacy in low tuberculosis-burden countries (US) and high tuberculosis-burden countries (India). The reasons for variable efficacy have been discussed at length in a WHO document on BCG.

Genetic variation in BCG strains
Genetic variation in the BCG strains may explain the variable efficacy reported in different trials.
Genetic variation in populations
Differences in the genetic makeup of different populations may explain the difference in efficacy. The Birmingham BCG trial was published in 1988. The trial, based in Birmingham, United Kingdom, examined children born to families who originated from the Indian subcontinent (where vaccine efficacy had previously been shown to be zero). The trial showed a 64% protective effect, similar to the figure from other UK trials, thus arguing against the genetic variation hypothesis.
Interference by nontuberculous mycobacteria
Exposure to environmental mycobacteria (especially Mycobacterium avium, Mycobacterium marinum and Mycobacterium intracellulare) results in a nonspecific immune response against mycobacteria. Administering BCG to someone with a nonspecific immune response against mycobacteria does not augment the response. BCG will, therefore, appear not to be efficacious because that person already has a level of immunity and BCG is not adding to that immunity. This effect is called masking because the effect of BCG is masked by environmental mycobacteria. Clinical evidence for this effect was found in a series of studies performed in parallel in adolescent school children in the UK and Malawi. In this study, the UK school children had a low baseline cellular immunity to mycobacteria which was increased by BCG; in contrast, the Malawi school children had a high baseline cellular immunity to mycobacteria and this was not significantly increased by BCG. Whether this natural immune response is protective is not known.
An alternative explanation is suggested by mouse studies; immunity against mycobacteria stops BCG from replicating and so stops it from producing an immune response. This is called the block hypothesis.
Interference by concurrent parasitic infection
In another hypothesis, simultaneous infection with parasites such as helminthiasis changes the immune response to BCG, making it less effective. As Th1 response is required for an effective immune response to tuberculous infection, but concurrent infection with various parasites produces a simultaneous Th2 response, which blunts the effect of BCG.

=== Mycobacteria ===
BCG has protective effects against some nontuberculosis mycobacteria.

- Leprosy: BCG has a protective effect against leprosy in the range of 20–80%.
- Buruli ulcer: BCG may protect against or delay the onset of Buruli ulcer.

=== Cancer ===
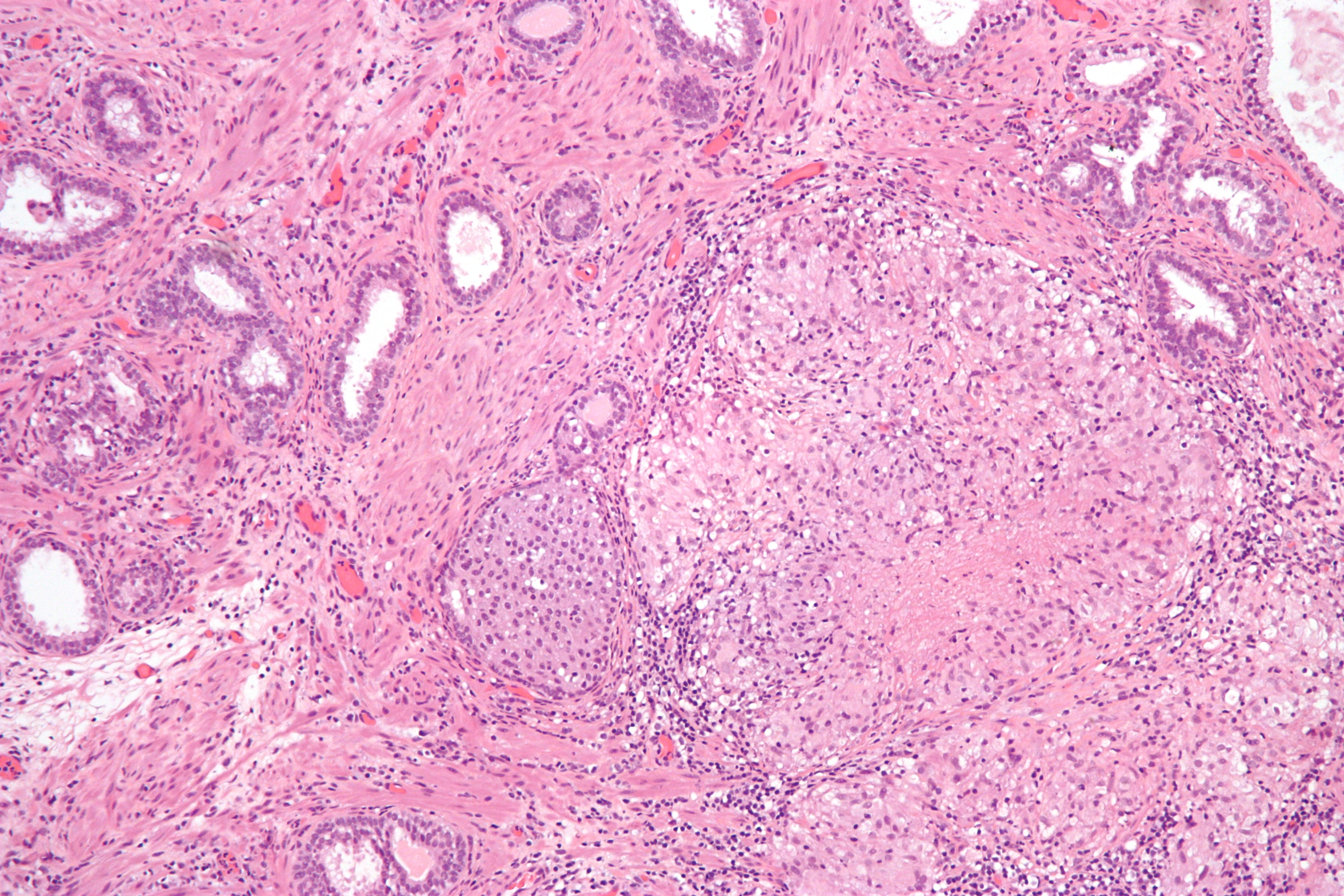
Micrograph showing granulomatous inflammation of bladder neck tissue due to Bacillus Calmette–Guérin used to treat bladder cancer, H&E stain

BCG has been one of the most successful immunotherapies. BCG vaccine has been the "standard of care for patients with bladder cancer (NMIBC)" since 1977. By 2014, more than eight different considered biosimilar agents or strains were used to treat nonmuscle-invasive bladder cancer.

- Several cancer vaccines use BCG as an additive to provide an initial stimulation of the person's immune system.
- BCG is used in the treatment of superficial forms of bladder cancer. Since the late 1970s, evidence has become available that the instillation of BCG into the bladder is an effective form of immunotherapy in this disease. While the mechanism is unclear, it appears a local immune reaction is mounted against the tumor. Immunotherapy with BCG prevents recurrence in up to 67% of cases of superficial bladder cancer.
- BCG has been evaluated in many studies as a therapy for colorectal cancer. The US biotech company Vaccinogen is evaluating BCG as an adjuvant to autologous tumour cells used as a cancer vaccine in stage II colon cancer.

== Method of administration ==
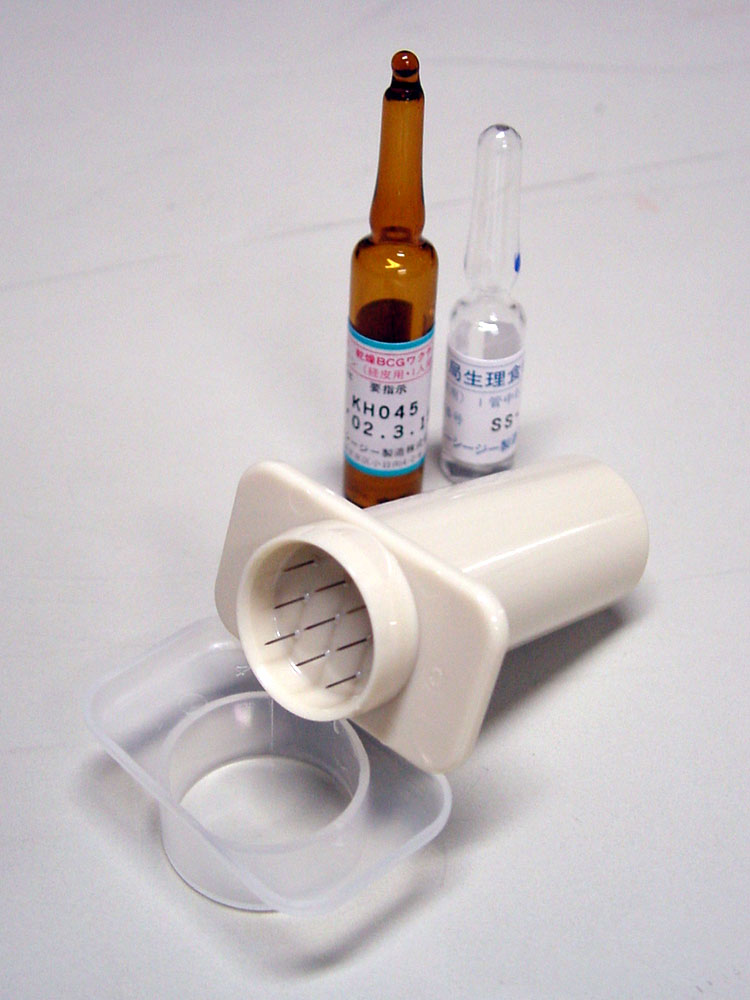
An apparatus (4–5 cm length, with 9 short needles) used for BCG vaccination in Japan, shown with ampules of BCG and saline

A pre-injection tuberculin skin test is usually carried out before administering the BCG vaccine. A reactive tuberculin skin test is a contraindication to BCG due to the risk of severe local inflammation and scarring; it does not indicate immunity. BCG is also contraindicated in certain people who have IL-12 receptor pathway defects.

BCG is given as a single intradermal injection at the insertion of the deltoid. If BCG is accidentally given subcutaneously, then a local abscess may form (a "BCG-oma") that can sometimes ulcerate, and may require treatment with antibiotics immediately, otherwise without treatment it could spread the infection, causing severe damage to vital organs. An abscess is not always associated with incorrect administration, and it is one of the more common complications that can occur with the vaccination. Numerous medical studies on the treatment of these abscesses with antibiotics have been done with varying results, but the consensus is once pus is aspirated and analysed, provided no unusual bacilli are present, the abscess will generally heal on its own in a matter of weeks.

The characteristic raised scar that BCG immunization leaves is often used as proof of prior immunization. This scar must be distinguished from that of smallpox vaccination, which it may resemble.

When given for bladder cancer, the vaccine is not injected through the skin but is instilled into the bladder (intravesical) through the urethra using a soft catheter.

== Adverse effects ==
BCG immunization generally causes some pain and scarring at the site of injection during infancy. The mechanism of this side effect is not fully understood, however it can be mitigated by performing the vaccination later in life. Usually wealthier regions have lower scar rate among the population, such as Western Europe, unlike its Eastern counterpart, where the BCG scar is considered widespread. The insertion to the deltoid muscle is typically used because the local complication rate is smallest for that site. In most countries it is the left shoulder, although some, like Brazil, administer the vaccination to the right. Nonetheless, the buttock is an alternative site of administration because it provides better cosmetic outcomes.

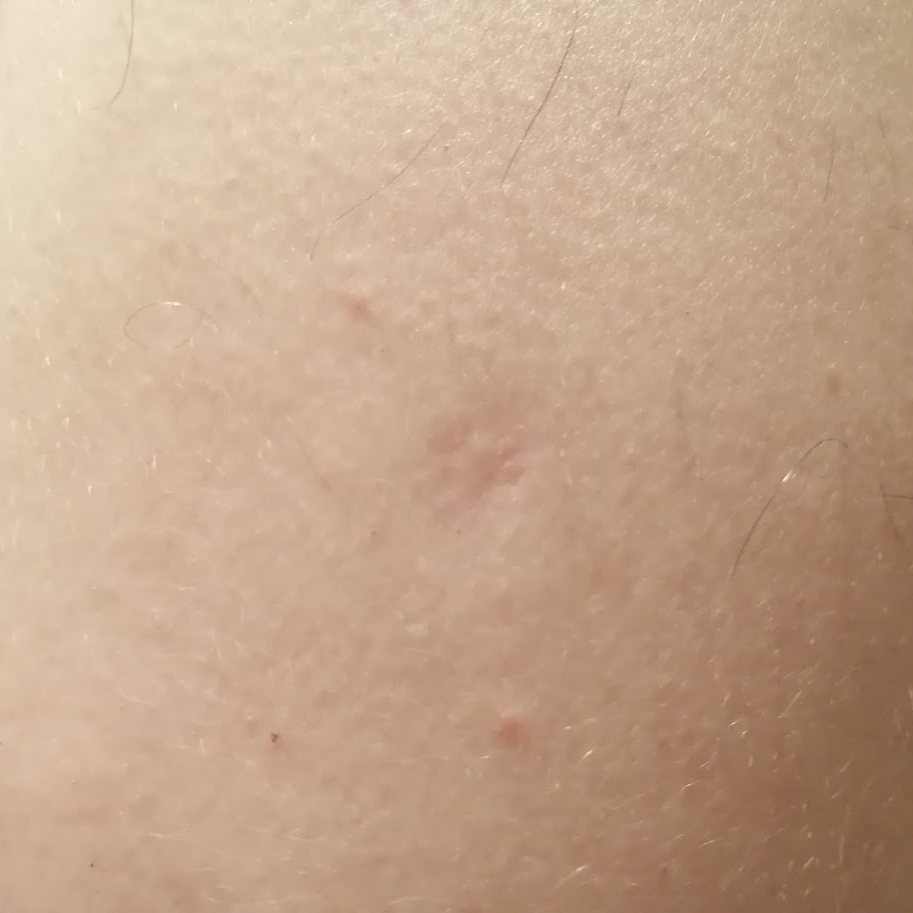
BCG vaccine scar on the patient's left shoulder

BCG vaccine should be given intradermally. If given subcutaneously, it may induce local infection and spread to the regional lymph nodes, causing either suppurative (production of pus) or nonsuppurative lymphadenitis. Conservative management is usually adequate for nonsuppurative lymphadenitis. If suppuration occurs, it may need needle aspiration. For unresolved suppuration, surgical excision may be required. Evidence for the treatment of these complications is scarce.

Uncommonly, breast and gluteal abscesses can occur due to haematogenous (carried by the blood) and lymphangiomatous spread. Regional bone infection (BCG osteomyelitis or osteitis) and disseminated BCG infection are rare complications of BCG vaccination, but potentially life-threatening. Systemic antituberculous therapy may be helpful in severe complications.

When BCG is used for bladder cancer, around 2.9% of treated patients discontinue immunotherapy due to a genitourinary or systemic BCG-related infection, however while symptomatic bladder BCG infection is frequent, the involvement of other organs is very uncommon. When systemic involvement occurs, liver and lungs are the first organs to be affected (1 week [median] after the last BCG instillation).

If BCG is accidentally given to an immunocompromised patient (e.g., an infant with severe combined immune deficiency), it can cause disseminated or life-threatening infection. The documented incidence of this happening is less than one per million immunizations given. In 2007, the WHO stopped recommending BCG for infants with HIV, even if the risk of exposure to tuberculosis is high, because of the risk of disseminated BCG infection (which is roughly 400 per 100,000 in that higher risk context).

== Usage ==
The person's age and the frequency with which BCG is given have always varied from country to country. The WHO recommends childhood BCG for all countries with a high incidence of tuberculosis and/or high leprosy burden. This is a partial list of historic and active BCG practices around the globe. A complete atlas of past and present practice has been generated. As of 2022, 155 countries offer the BCG vaccine in their schedule.

=== Americas ===
- Brazil introduced universal BCG immunization in 1967–1968, and the practice continues to this day. According to Brazilian law, BCG is also given to people who live together with patients with leprosy.
- Canadian Indigenous communities receive the BCG vaccine, and in the province of Quebec the vaccine was offered to children until the mid-1970s.
- Most countries in Central and South America have universal BCG immunizations, as does Mexico.
- The United States has never used mass immunization of BCG due to the rarity of tuberculosis in the US, relying instead on the detection and treatment of latent tuberculosis.

=== Europe ===
BCG vaccine in Europe
Country	Mandatory in the past	Mandatory now	Years vaccine was mandatory
Austria	Yes	No	1952–1990
Armenia	Yes	Yes	1962–present (reintroduced in 1998)
Belgium	No	No	N/A
Bosnia and Herzegovina	Yes	Yes	1950–present
Bulgaria	Yes	Yes	1951–present
Croatia	Yes	Yes	1948–present
Czech Republic	Yes	No	1953–2010
Denmark	Yes	No	1946–1986
Estonia	Yes	Yes	1962–present
Finland	Yes	No	1941–2006
France	Yes	No	1950–2007
Germany	Yes	No	1961–1998 (East Germany began 1951)
Greece	Yes	No	?–2016
Hungary	Yes	Yes	1953–present
Ireland	Yes	No	1950s–2015
Italy	No	No	N/A
Latvia	Yes	Yes	1962–present (can be refused)
Lithuania	Yes	Yes	1962–present
Moldova	Yes	Yes	1962–present
Netherlands	Yes	No	?–1979
North Macedonia	Yes	Yes	1950–present
Norway	Yes	No	1947–1995, voluntary 1995–2009
Poland	Yes	Yes	1955–present
Portugal	Yes	No	1965–2016
Romania	Yes	Yes	1928–present
Russia	Yes	No	1962–2012
Serbia	Yes	Yes	1928–present
Slovakia	Yes	No	1953–2012
Slovenia	Yes	No	1947–2005
Spain	Yes	No	1965–1981
Sweden	Yes	No	1940–1975
Switzerland	Yes	No	1960s–1987
Turkey	Yes	Yes	1952–present (can be refused after 2016)
Ukraine	Yes	Yes	1962–present (can be refused after 2000)
United Kingdom	No	No	N/A

=== Asia ===
- China: Introduced in the 1930s. Increasingly, it became more widespread after 1949. The majority were inoculated by 1979.
- South Korea, Singapore, Taiwan, and Malaysia. In these countries, BCG was given at birth and again at age 12. In Malaysia and Singapore from 2001, this policy was changed to once only at birth. South Korea stopped re-vaccination in 2008.
- Hong Kong: BCG is given to all newborns.
- Japan: In Japan, BCG was introduced in 1951, given typically at age 6. From 2005 it is administered between five and eight months after birth, and no later than a child's first birthday. BCG was administered no later than the fourth birthday until 2005, and no later than six months from birth from 2005 to 2012; the schedule was changed in 2012 due to reports of osteitis side effects from vaccinations at 3–4 months. Some municipalities recommend an earlier immunization schedule.
- Thailand: In Thailand, the BCG vaccine is given routinely at birth.
- India and Pakistan: India and Pakistan introduced BCG mass immunization in 1948, the first countries outside Europe to do so. In 2015, millions of infants were denied BCG vaccine in Pakistan for the first time due to shortage globally.
- Mongolia: All newborns are vaccinated with BCG. Previously, the vaccine was also given at ages 8 and 15, although this is no longer common practice.
- Philippines: BCG vaccine started in the Philippines in 1979 with the Expanded Program on Immunization.
- Sri Lanka: In Sri Lanka, The National Policy of Sri Lanka is to give BCG vaccination to all newborn babies immediately after birth. BCG vaccination is carried out under the Expanded Programme of Immunisation (EPI).

=== Middle East ===
- Israel: BCG was given to all newborns between 1955 and 1982.
- Iran: Iran's vaccination policy was implemented in 1984. Vaccination with the Bacillus Calmette–Guerin (BCG) is among the most important tuberculosis control strategies in Iran [2]. According to Iranian neonatal vaccination policy, BCG has been given as a single dose to children aged <6 years, shortly after birth or at first contact with the health services.

=== Africa ===
- South Africa: In South Africa, the BCG Vaccine is given routinely at birth, to all newborns, except those with clinically symptomatic AIDS. The vaccination site is in the right arm.
- Morocco: In Morocco, the BCG was introduced in 1949. The policy is BCG vaccination at birth, to all newborns.
- Kenya: In Kenya, the BCG Vaccine is given routinely at birth to all newborns.

=== South Pacific ===
- Australia: BCG vaccination was used between the 1950s and mid-1980s. BCG has not been part of routine vaccination since the mid-1980s.
- New Zealand: BCG Immunisation was first introduced for 13-year-olds in 1948. Vaccination was phased out from 1963 to 1990.

== Manufacture ==
BCG is prepared from a strain of the attenuated (virulence-reduced) live bovine tuberculosis bacillus, Mycobacterium bovis, that has lost its ability to cause disease in humans. It is specially subcultured in a culture medium, usually Middlebrook 7H9. Because the living bacilli evolve to make the best use of available nutrients, they become less well-adapted to human blood and can no longer induce disease when introduced into a human host. Still, they are similar enough to their wild ancestors to provide some immunity against human tuberculosis. The BCG vaccine can be anywhere from 0 to 80% effective in preventing tuberculosis for 15 years; however, its protective effect appears to vary according to geography and the lab in which the vaccine strain was grown.

Several companies make BCG, sometimes using different genetic strains of the bacterium. This may result in different product characteristics. OncoTICE, used for bladder instillation for bladder cancer, was developed by Organon Laboratories (since acquired by Schering-Plough, and in turn acquired by Merck & Co.). A similar application is the product of Onko BCG of the Polish company Biomed-Lublin, which owns the Brazilian substrain M. bovis BCG Moreau which is less reactogenic than vaccines including other BCG strains. Pacis BCG, made from the Montréal (Institut Armand-Frappier) strain, was first marketed by Urocor in about 2002. Urocor was since acquired by Dianon Systems. Evans Vaccines (a subsidiary of PowderJect Pharmaceuticals). Statens Serum Institut in Denmark has marketed a BCG vaccine prepared using Danish strain 1331. The production of BCG Danish strain 1331 and its distribution was later undertaken by AJVaccines company since the ownership transfer of SSI's vaccine production business to AJ Vaccines Holding A/S which took place on 16 January 2017. Japan BCG Laboratory markets its vaccine, based on the Tokyo 172 substrain of Pasteur BCG, in 50 countries worldwide.

According to a UNICEF report published in December 2015, on BCG vaccine supply security, global demand increased in 2015 from 123 to 152.2 million doses. To improve security and to [diversify] sources of affordable and flexible supply," UNICEF awarded seven new manufacturers contracts to produce BCG. Along with supply availability from existing manufacturers, and a "new WHO prequalified vaccine" the total supply will be "sufficient to meet both suppressed 2015 demand carried over to 2016, as well as total forecast demand through 2016–2018."

=== Supply shortage ===
In 2011, the Sanofi Pasteur plant flooded, causing problems with mold. The facility, located in Toronto, Ontario, Canada, produced BCG vaccine products made with substrain Connaught such as a tuberculosis vaccine and ImmuCYST, a BCG immunotherapeutic and bladder cancer drug. By April 2012 the FDA had found dozens of documented problems with sterility at the plant including mold, nesting birds and rusted electrical conduits. The resulting closure of the plant for over two years caused shortages of bladder cancer and tuberculosis vaccines. On 29 October 2014 Health Canada gave the permission for Sanofi to resume production of BCG. A 2018 analysis of the global supply concluded that the supplies are adequate to meet forecast BCG vaccine demand, but that risks of shortages remain, mainly due to dependence of 75 percent of WHO pre-qualified supply on just two suppliers.

=== Dried ===
Some BCG vaccines are freeze dried and become fine powder. Sometimes the powder is sealed with vacuum in a glass ampoule. Such a glass ampoule has to be opened slowly to prevent the airflow from blowing out the powder. Then the powder has to be diluted with saline water before injecting.

== History ==
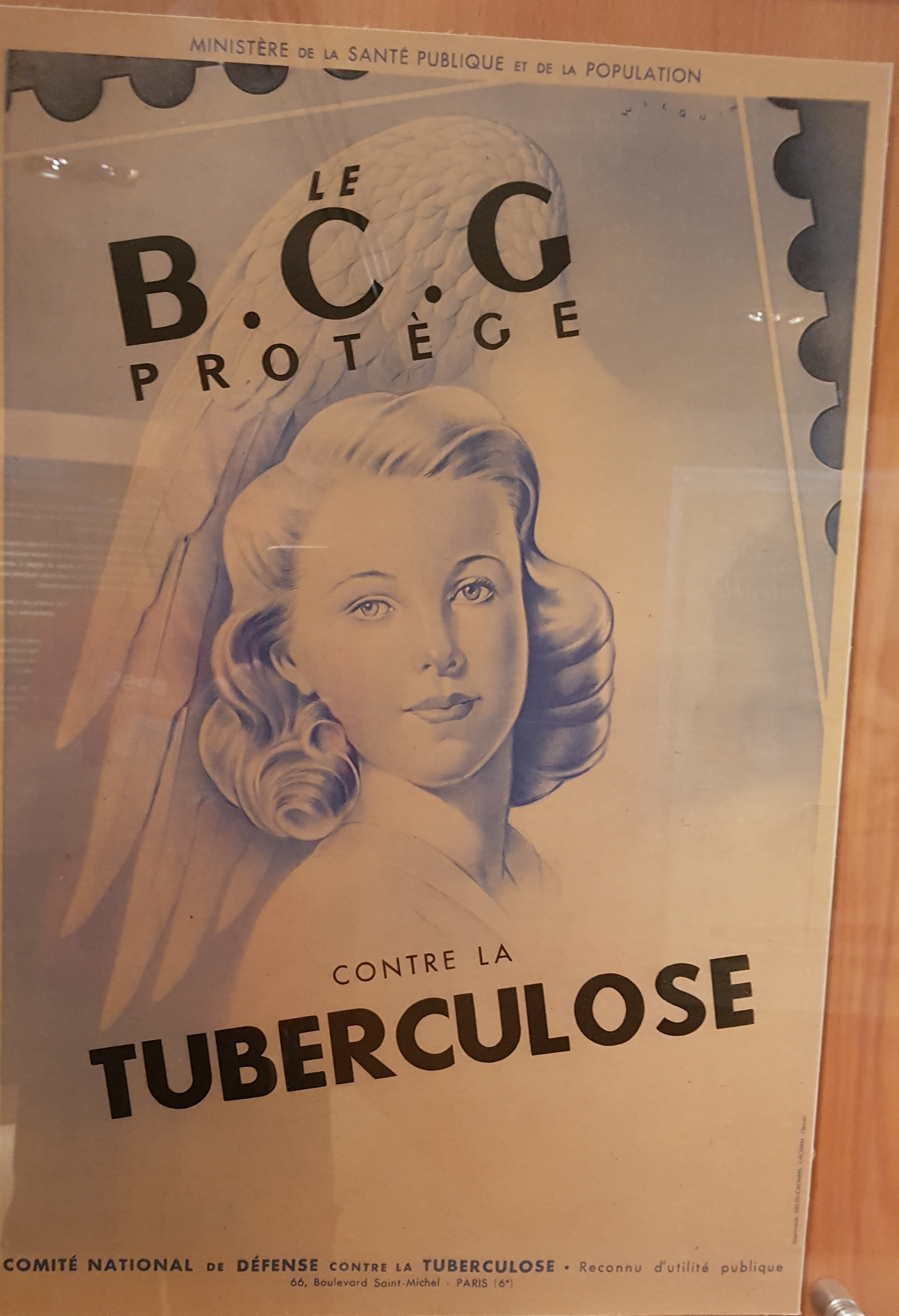
French poster promoting the BCG vaccine

The history of BCG is tied to that of smallpox. By 1865 Jean Antoine Villemin had demonstrated that rabbits could be infected with tuberculosis from humans; by 1868 he had found that rabbits could be infected with tuberculosis from cows and that rabbits could be infected with tuberculosis from other rabbits. Thus, he concluded that tuberculosis was transmitted via some unidentified microorganism (or "virus", as he called it). In 1882 Robert Koch regarded human and bovine tuberculosis as identical. But in 1895, Theobald Smith presented differences between human and bovine tuberculosis, which he reported to Koch. By 1901 Koch distinguished Mycobacterium bovis from Mycobacterium tuberculosis. Following the success of vaccination in preventing smallpox, established during the 18th century, scientists thought to find a corollary in tuberculosis by drawing a parallel between bovine tuberculosis and cowpox: it was hypothesized that infection with bovine tuberculosis might protect against infection with human tuberculosis. In the late 19th century, clinical trials using M. bovis were conducted in Italy with disastrous results, because M. bovis was found to be just as virulent as M. tuberculosis.

Albert Calmette, a French physician and bacteriologist, and his assistant and later colleague, Camille Guérin, a veterinarian, were working at the Institut Pasteur de Lille (Lille, France) in 1908. Their work included subculturing virulent strains of the tuberculosis bacillus and testing different culture media. They noted a glycerin-bile-potato mixture grew bacilli that seemed less virulent and changed the course of their research to see if repeated subculturing would produce a strain that was attenuated enough to be considered for use as a vaccine. The BCG strain was isolated after subculturing 239 times during 13 years from a virulent strain on glycerine potato medium. The research continued throughout World War I until 1919 when the now avirulent bacilli were unable to cause tuberculosis disease in research animals. Calmette and Guerin transferred to the Paris Pasteur Institute in 1919. The BCG vaccine was first used in humans in 1921.

Public acceptance was slow, and the Lübeck disaster, in particular, did much to harm it. Between 1929 and 1933 in Lübeck, 251 infants were vaccinated in the first 10 days of life; 173 developed tuberculosis and 72 died. It was subsequently discovered that the BCG administered there had been contaminated with a virulent strain that was being stored in the same incubator, which led to legal action against the vaccine's manufacturers.

Dr. R. G. Ferguson, working at the Fort Qu'Appelle Sanatorium in Saskatchewan, was among the pioneers in developing the practice of vaccination against tuberculosis. In Canada, more than 600 children from residential schools were used as involuntary participants in BCG vaccine trials between 1933 and 1945. In 1928, the BCG vaccine was adopted by the Health Committee of the League of Nations (predecessor to the World Health Organization (WHO)). Because of opposition, however, it only became widely used after World War II. From 1945 to 1948, relief organizations (International Tuberculosis Campaign or Joint Enterprises) vaccinated over eight million babies in Eastern Europe and prevented the predicted typical increase of tuberculosis after a major war.

The BCG vaccine is very efficacious against tuberculous meningitis in the pediatric age group, but its efficacy against pulmonary tuberculosis appears variable. Some countries have removed the BCG vaccine from routine vaccination. Two countries that have never used it routinely are the United States and the Netherlands (in both countries, it is felt that having a reliable Mantoux test and therefore being able to accurately detect active disease is more beneficial to society than vaccinating against a relatively rare condition).

Other names include "Vaccin Bilié de Calmette et Guérin vaccine" and "Bacille de Calmette et Guérin vaccine".

== Research ==
=== Alternative routes of administration ===
In rhesus macaques, BCG shows "unprecedented" rates of TB protection when given intravenously. Some risks must be evaluated before it can be translated to humans.

The University of Oxford Jenner Institute is conducting a study comparing the efficacy of injected versus inhaled BCG vaccine in already-vaccinated adults.

=== Non-TB conditions ===
Tentative evidence exists for a beneficial non-specific effect of intradermal BCG vaccination on overall mortality in low-income countries, or for its reducing other health problems including sepsis and respiratory infections when given early, with greater benefit the earlier it is used.

There is also tentative evidence of intravesical (injected into the bladder) BCG providing some protection against future dementia.

==== Type 1 diabetes ====
As of 2017, intradermal BCG vaccine is in the early stages of being studied in type 1 diabetes (T1D). A 2024 systematic review reports effects on HbA1c control. A brief update in 2025 reports encouraging progress in studies totaling 600 participants. Follow-up studies of participants of the original Phase I trial show lasting HbA1c reductions.

==== COVID-19 ====
Use of the intradermal BCG vaccine may provide protection against COVID-19. However, epidemiologic observations in this respect are ambiguous. The WHO does not recommend its use for prevention as of 12 January 2021.

As of January 2021, 20 BCG trials are in various clinical stages. As of October 2022, the results are extremely mixed. A 15-month trial involving people thrice-vaccinated over the two years before the pandemic shows positive results in preventing infection in BCG-naive people with type 1 diabetes. On the other hand, a 5-month trial shows that re-vaccinating with BCG does not help prevent infection in healthcare workers. Both of these trials were double-blind randomized controlled trials (RCTs).

A 2024 systmatic review of 12 RCTs reports that BCG does not help protect against COVID-19. Follow up of one of the BCG-COVID trials (BATTLE) shows positive results in preventing long COVID.

== Veterinary use ==
BCG is used in England by licensed individuals to vaccinate wild badgers by trapping and release. It reduces new bovine TB infection rates by up to 76% in vaccinated badgers. It also exhibits a herd immunity effect, where a badger social group with more than one-third vaccination coverage shows up to 79% lower new infection in cubs. There is no evidence that vaccinated badgers excrete live BCG into the environment. Vaccination initiatives have been lead both by the government's Animal and Plant Health Agency and by private individuals and groups such as farmers seeking to protect their livestock and landowners seeking to clear their land of TB.

BCG vaccination in cattle has completed a phase II trial in the UK with satisfactory results. The phase III trial started in 2025.
