= Lübeck disaster =

Medical negligence case in Weimar Germany

Lübeck vaccine disaster
- Native name: Lübecker Impfunglück
- English name: Lübeck vaccine disaster
- Date: 1929–1933
- Location: Lübeck, Germany
- Type: Medical disaster
- Cause: Contamination of BCG vaccine with virulent tuberculosis bacteria
- Target: Infants
- Perpetrator: Laboratory error
- Participants: Infants given contaminated BCG vaccine
- Outcome: Legal proceedings, changes in BCG vaccine administration
- Casualties: 67 (67/251; 26.7%) infants died of tuberculosis 173 developed tuberculosis 251 infants given contaminated vaccine
- Deaths: 77 (30.7%) vaccinated infants died, but 10 died from causes other than tuberculosis.
- Injuries: 173
- Inquiries: Inquiry by Bruno Lange and Ludwig Lange
- Accused: Georg Deycke; Ernst Altstaedt, Max Klotz, Anna Schütze
- Convicted: Georg Deycke; Ernst Altstaedt
- Charges: Negligent homicide, negligent bodily harm
- Verdict: Deycke: Guilty, 2 years prison; Altstaedt: Guilty, 15 months prison; Klotz, Schütze: Acquitted
- Convictions: Georg Deycke, Ernst Altstaedt
- Sentence: Deycke: 2 years prison; Altstaedt: 15 months prison
- Contamination caused by laboratory error, not the BCG vaccine itself.

From 1929 to 1933, 251 infants in Lübeck, northern Germany, were given three doses of the oral BCG vaccine against tuberculosis, which was accidentally contaminated with the bacteria responsible for the disease. 173 later developed signs of the illness and 77 died. It was initially thought that of the 77, only 72 died of TB causes.

== Contaminated vaccine ==
This vaccine itself was initially blamed, until an inquiry headed by Bruno Lange of the Robert Koch Institute and Ludwig Lange of the Ministry of Health identified contamination as the cause. The event later became known as the Lübeck disaster, or in German, the Lübecker Impfunglück (Lübeck vaccine disaster). Major scientific journals worldwide commented on the disaster and subsequent trials of the medical staff, such as The Lancet and the Journal of the American Medical Association.

== Legal consequences ==
On 6 February 1932, Georg Deycke, the head of the general hospital in Lübeck, was found guilty of negligent homicide and negligent bodily harm, and sentenced to two years in prison. Deycke negligently cultivated the BCG vaccine in a laboratory unsuitable for vaccine production and refrained from animal experiments. Ernst Altstaedt was sentenced to 15 months in prison for negligent homicide and negligent bodily harm as he did not test the vaccine in animal experiments and only insufficiently observed the children. The co-accused chairman of the Lübeck health department, Max Klotz, was acquitted, as was Deycke's laboratory assistant, Anna Schütze.

== Subsequent developments ==
Despite the investigation's finding that contamination caused by laboratory error (not the BCG vaccine itself) was the cause of the deaths, the Lübeck disaster diminished public confidence in, and usage of, the BCG vaccine for a time. After the tragedy, the oral route of administration for BCG vaccine was discontinued. It was replaced by alternate, improved methods of administration for the BCG vaccine: intradermal (ID) (introduced 1927), multiple puncture (1939), and scarification (1947). The First International BCG Congress in Paris, held in 1948, concluded that the BCG vaccine was safe and effective. With the BCG vaccine's safety and effectiveness established, and new methods of administration, confidence in the BCG vaccine was restored, and mass vaccination campaigns resumed globally. Compulsory BCG vaccination of infants was reinstated in East Germany in 1952.
