= Coplin =

Coplin may refer to:

== People ==
- Amber Lynn Coplin, American murder victim
- Amanda Coplin, American novelist
- Bill Coplin, American professor

== Places ==
- Coplin Plantation, Maine, United States, a census-designated place

== See also ==
- Caplin (disambiguation)
