= List of shipwrecks in November 1874 =

The list of shipwrecks in November 1874 includes ships sunk, foundered, wrecked, grounded, or otherwise lost during November 1874.

== 1 November ==
List of shipwrecks: 1 November 1874
Ship	State	Description
A. D. C.	Jamaica	The sloop was driven ashore in a hurricane at Kingston.
Annotto Bay	Jamaica	The packet ship sank in a hurricane at Kingston.
Balmoral	United Kingdom	The steamship was driven ashore at the Point de Lornel, Pas-de-Calais, France. She was on a voyage from Saint-Malo, Ille-et-Vilaine, France to Antwerp, Belgium.
Beckworth	United Kingdom	The brig was driven ashore at Dungeness, Kent. She was on a voyage from London to Palma de Mallorca, Spain. She was refloated with the assistance of a tug and put back to Gravesend, Kent.
Brigand	Dominican Republic	The schooner was driven ashore in a hurricane at Kingston.
Brilliant	Jamaica	The schooner was damaged in a hurricane at Kingston.
Defiance	Jamaica	The ship was driven ashore in a hurricane at Port Royal.
Delfina	United Kingdom	The steamship struck a sunken rock and was wrecked at "Pimla Leonis", Chile with the loss of nineteen lives. She was on a voyage from the Colony of Natal to "Guyacan".
Evelina	Jamaica	The ship was driven ashore in a hurricane at Port Royal.
Florida	Jamaica	The sloop was wrecked in a hurricane at Kingston.
Foam	Jamaica	The sloop was driven ashore in a hurricane at Port Morant.
Frances Anne	Jamaica	The schooner sank in a hurricane at Kingston.
Freya	Sweden	The ship was driven ashore at Furillen, Gotland.
Gazelle	Jamaica	The ship was severely damaged in a hurricane at Kingston.
Hannah	Jamaica	The ship was severely damaged in a hurricane at Port Royal.
Hedwig	Sweden	The barque was driven ashore at Dungeness.
Helen	United Kingdom	The brigantine was driven ashore and wrecked in a hurricane at Jamaica.
Jane Nelson	Jamaica	The schooner sprang a leak in a hurricane at Kingston.
Katinka	Jamaica	The ship sank in a hurricane at Kingston.
Kenneth	United Kingdom	The brigantine was severely damaged in a hurricane at Port Royal. She was refloated.
Kitty Glidden	(Dominion of Newfoundland) Newfoundland Colony	The ship was driven ashore and severely damaged. She was on a voyage from Labrador to Harbour Grace.
Lizzie	United States	The brigantine was driven ashore in a hurricane at Port Royal.
Lizzie W. verden	United States	The brigantine was driven ashore and wrecked in a hurricane at Port Maria, Jamaica.
Louisa	Jamaica	The schooner was damaged in a hurricane at Kingston.
Morning Star	Jamaica	The ship sank in a hurricane at Kingston.
Moselle	Jamaica	The schooner was driven ashore in a hurricane at Port Royal.
Princess Royal	Jamaica	The sloop sank in a hurricane at Kingston with the loss of one life.
Manchester	Jamaica	The ship was driven ashore in a hurricane at Port Royal.
Moselle	Jamaica	The schooner was driven ashore in a hurricane at Port Royal.
Pacific	Canada	The full-rigged ship was driven ashore and wrecked at Stackpole Head, Pembrokeshire, United Kingdom with the loss of a crew member. She was on a voyage from Antwerp to Cardiff, Glamorgan, United Kingdom.
P. G. R.	Jamaica	The sloop was driven ashore in a hurricane at Port Morant.
Queen	Jamaica	The schooner was driven ashore in a hurricane at Dry Harbour.
Rose	Jamaica	The cutter was wrecked in a hurricane at Oracabessa. She was on a voyage from Port Maria to Oracabessa.
Rose	United Kingdom	The schooner was driven ashore in a hurricane at Port Royal.
Sarah	Jamaica	The ship was severely damaged in a hurricane at Port Royal.
Sarah A. Dudman	Canada	The barque was driven ashore at Dulas, Anglesey, United Kingdom. She was on a voyage from Liverpool, Lancashire, United Kingdom to Tybee Island, Georgia, United States. She was refloated with the assistance of a tug and beached at Beaumaris, Anglesey. She was refloated on 7 November and taken in to Liverpool.
Spray	Jamaica	The sloop was driven ashore in a hurricane at Port Morant.
Swan	Jamaica	The schooner was driven ashore in a hurricane at Kingston.
Tekla	Germany	The barque was driven ashore at the South Foreland, Kent. She was on a voyage from Hamburg to Shanghai, China. She was refloated and taken in to The Downs in a leaky condition.
Trelawney	Jamaica	The schooner was driven onto the wreck of Katinka (Jamaica) in a hurricane at Kingston.
Village Belle	United States	The schooner sank in a hurricane at Kingston with the loss of two or three lives.
Wave	Jamaica	The schooner was driven ashore in a hurricane at Kingston.
Winchester	Jamaica	The sloop was driven ashore in a hurricane at Port Morant.

== 2 November ==
List of shipwrecks: 2 November 1874
Ship	State	Description
Annabella	United Kingdom	The brig was abandoned in the North Sea off the coast of Norfolk. Her crew were rescued by the steamship F. T. Barry (United Kingdom).
Czar	Sweden	The ship was destroyed by fire at Gävle, Sweden.
Emanuel	United Kingdom	The ship was abandoned in the North Sea off the coast of Jutland in a sinking condition. Her crew were rescued by Emma (United Kingdom). Emanuel was on a voyage from Riga, Russia to Grangemouth, Stirlingshire.
Fortuna	United Kingdom	The ship was driven ashore at Portaferry, County Down. She was on a voyage from Glasgow, Renfrewshire to Dublin. She as refloated.
Industry	United Kingdom	The schooner was driven ashore on Terschelling, Friesland, Netherlands. She was refloated and taken in to Harlingen, Friesland in a leaky condition.
Olinda	Brazil	The ship was driven ashore and wrecked at Maldonado, Uruguay.
Principe	Brazil	The ship was driven ashore and wrecked at Maldonado.
Soebloemsten	Norway	The barque ran aground on the Longsand, in the North Sea off the coast of Essex, United Kingdom and was abandoned by her crew. She was on a voyage from Söderhamn, Sweden to London, United Kingdom. She was refloated on 4 November with the assistance of a number of smacks and a tug and taken in to Harwich, Essex in a waterlogged condition.

== 3 November ==
List of shipwrecks: 3 November 1874
Ship	State	Description
Aurora	United Kingdom	The steamship collided with the steamship Albicore (United Kingdom) at Maassluis, South Holland, Netherlands and was left in a sinking condition. She was on a voyage from London to Rotterdam, South Holland.
Bayo, and Thames	Spain; United Kingdom	The steamship Bayo collided with the barque Thames at Tarifa and was abandoned by her crew. She was on a voyage from Cádiz to a port in eastern Spain. She subsequently sank. Thames was on a voyage from Oran, Algeria to Aberdeen. She sank; her crew were rescued.
Doris	United Kingdom	The full-rigged ship was driven ashore at Carrickfergus, County Antrim. She was on a voyage from Glasgow, Renfrewshire to Plymouth, Devon. She was refloated with the assistance of a steamship.
Herbert Beech	United Kingdom	The ship ran aground north of Greenore, County Louth. She was on a voyage from Saint John, New Brunswick, Canada to Warrenpoint, County Antrim.
Hugh Streatfield	United Kingdom	The steamship was driven ashore on Heligoland. She was on a voyage from Sunderland, County Durham, to Hamburg, Germany. She was refloated and completed her voyage.
Louise Elizabeth	United Kingdom	The sschooner was driven ashore in Robin Hoods Bay. She was on a voyage from King's Lynn, Norfolk to Newcastle upon Tyne, Northumberland. She was refloated.
St. François	France	The brig collided with the steamship Cawdor Castle (United Kingdom) and sank at Shanghai, China. St. François was on a voyage from Fremantle, Western Australia to Shanghai.
Tom Pyman	United Kingdom	The steamship ran aground on the Jenkin Sand, in the Thames Estuary. She was on a voyage from Riga, Russia to London. She was refloated and taken in to Gravesend, Kent.
Unknown	Flag unknown	The barque ran aground on the Kentish Knock.

== 4 November ==
List of shipwrecks: 4 November 1874
Ship	State	Description
Bride	(United Kingdom of Great Britain and Ireland) Isle of Man	The schooner was driven ashore at Robin Rigg, north of Maryport, Cumberland.
Colombo	United Kingdom	The steamship ran aground in the River Avon. She was on a voyage from Taganrog, Russia to Bristol, Gloucestershire.
Elisa	Denmark	The schooner was driven ashore at "Udo". She was on a voyage from Oskarshamn, Sweden to Leith, Lothian, United Kingdom.
Eliza	United Kingdom	The schooner ran aground at Arbroath, Forfarshire.
Main	United Kingdom	The steamship was driven ashore at Gurnard, Isle of Wight, United Kingdom. She was on a voyage from New York, United States to Bremen. She was refloated and taken in to Southampton, Hampshire, United Kingdom.
Sefton	United Kingdom	The schooner was driven ashore near Blakeney, Norfolk. She was on a voyage from Inverkeithing, Fife to London. She was refloated the next day. and taken in to Blakeney.

== 5 November ==
List of shipwrecks: 5 November 1874
Ship	State	Description
Alexandra	United Kingdom	The ship was driven ashore on Walney Island, Lancashire. She was on a voyage from London to Barrow-in-Furness, Lancashire.
Ann	United Kingdom	The schooner was driven ashore at Flamborough Head, Yorkshire. She was refloated on 8 November and resumed her voyage.
Kate	United Kingdom	The schooner was driven ashore on the coast of Fife.
Maggie Lauder	United Kingdom	The ship was wrecked on Anticosti Island, Nova Scotia, Canada. Her crew were rescued. She was on a voyage from Quebec City to Cardiff, Glamorgan.
Moderatie	Netherlands	The ship was driven ashore at Dragør, Denmark. She was on a voyage from Härnösand, Sweden to Harlingen, Friesland. She was refloated.
Schwalbe	Germany	The barque was driven ashore in Casperwick Bay. She was on a voyage from Liverpool, Lancashire, United Kingdom to Kunda, Russia. She was refloated and taken in to Kunda in a leaky condition.
Vrouw Wilhelmina	Germany	The ship collided with the steamship Vandyck (United Kingdom) and sank at Antwerp, Belgium. She was on a voyage from Duisburg to Antwerp.
Young Mary	United Kingdom	The schooner was driven ashore and sank between Flamborough Head and Speeton, Yorkshire. Her crew survived. She was on a voyage from Goole, Yorkshire to Ipswich, Suffolk.

== 6 November ==
List of shipwrecks: 6 November 1874
Ship	State	Description
Annie Vernon	United Kingdom	The steamship was run down and sunk in the Rio Tinto by the steamship Edward Williams with some loss of life. She was refloated on 10 December.
Bjergvin	Norway	The ship was driven ashore at Strömstad, Sweden. Her crew were rescued. She was on a voyage from Leer, Germany to Larvik.
Due Fratelli Colgagno	Italy	The ship ran aground at Galway, United Kingdom. She was on a voyage from Baltimore, Maryland, United States to Galway. She was refloated the next day and taken in to Galway.
Express	United Kingdom	The ship struck a rock at Portreath, Cornwall and was damaged.
Ida	United Kingdom	The ship was driven ashore in Placentia Bay. She was on a voyage from "Lamanchs" to Swansea, Glamorgan.
Indiam Empire	United Kingdom	The barque capsized at Cardiff, Glamorgan.
Sommerville	United Kingdom	The ship was driven ashore on Green Island. She was on a voyage from Montreal, Quebec, Canada to Montevideo, Uruguay.
Zuider Zee	Netherlands	The ship was driven ashore on the east coast of Öland, Sweden. She was on a voyage from Härnösand, Sweden to Harlingen, Friesland. She was later refloated and resumed her voyage.

== 7 November ==
List of shipwrecks: 7 November 1874
Ship	State	Description
Constance	Netherlands	The ship was driven ashore near Egmond aan Zee, North Holland. She was on a voyage from "Pangool" to Amsterdam, North Holland. .She was later refloated and taken in to the Nieuw Diep.
Delta	United Kingdom	The ship was driven ashore and wrecked on Caribou Island, Nova Scotia, Canada. All on board were rescued. She was on a voyage from London to Montreal, Quebec and Quebec City, Canada.
Elizabeth Davies	United Kingdom	The schooner was abandoned. She was on a voyage from Aberystwyth, Cardiganshire to Runcorn, Cheshire.
Isar	Germany	The ship was driven ashore at Hela. She was on a voyage from Danzig to Aberdeen, United Kingdom. She was refloated the next day and resumed her voyage.
Milan	United Kingdom	The steamship was driven ashore at Dragør, Denmark. She was on a voyage from Kronstadt, Russia to Hull, Yorkshire. She was refloated with the assistance of two steamships.
Romeo	United Kingdom	The ship departed from Liverpool, Lancashire for Berbice, British Guiana. No further trace, presumed foundered with the loss of all hands.

== 8 November ==
List of shipwrecks: 8 November 1874
Ship	State	Description
Adeline	United Kingdom	The schooner was wrecked in the Maldives. Her crew survived.
Jacomina Cornelia	United Kingdom	The ship was driven ashore at Grötlingbo, Gotland, Sweden. She was on a voyage from Riga, Russia to Rotterdam, South Holland.
Unnamed	United Kingdom	The Mersey Flat sank in Liverpool Bay.

== 9 November ==
List of shipwrecks: 9 November 1874
Ship	State	Description
Avenir	France	The steamship was driven ashore near Cap Couronne, Bouches-du-Rhône.
Delta	Canada	The steamship was driven ashore at Cap-Chat, Quebec. All on board were rescued. She was declared a total loss.
Green Olive	United Kingdom	The brig ran aground on the Middle Cross Sand, in the North Sea off the coast of Norfolk. She was on a voyage from the River Tyne to Lisbon, Portugal. She was refloated with the assistance of a tug and taken in to Great Yarmouth, Norfolk.

== 10 November ==
List of shipwrecks: 10 November 1874
Ship	State	Description
Alpha	United Kingdom	The ship was severely damaged by fire at Stanley, Falkland Islands. She was on a voyage from Swansea, Glamorgan to Valparaíso, Chile.
Finboge	Germany	The ship ran aground at Falmouth, Cornwall, United Kingdom. She was on a voyage from Marvin, Virginia, United States to Hamburg.
Friendship	United Kingdom	The ship was driven ashore at Blakeney, Norfolk. She was refloated with the assistance of a tug and resumed her voyage.
Glentait	United Kingdom	The ship was damaged by fire at Stanley. She was on a voyage from Cardiff, Glamorgan to Coquimbo, Chile.
Ino	United Kingdom	The schooner ran aground on the North Bank, in Liverpool Bay and sank. Her crew were rescued by the Hoylake Lifeboat. She was refloated on 14 November and towed in to Hoylake, Cheshire by two fishing boats.
John Dixon	United Kingdom	The steamship collided with the steamship Queen Anne (United Kingdom) and sank at Malta with the loss of three of her crew. John Dixon was on a voyage from Malta to Alexandria, Egypt. She was refloated on 11 September 1875.
Marquis of Lorne	United Kingdom	The steamship ran aground at Brouwershaven, Zeeland, Netherlands. She was refloated.
Minerva	Germany	The barque was driven ashore at Memel. Her crew were rescued.
Nathaniel	United Kingdom	The brig ran aground and was wrecked on the Ooster Bank, in the North Sea off the Dutch coast. Her crew were rescued. She was on a voyage from Newcastle upon Tyne, Northumberland to Dordrecht, South Holland, Netherlands.
Richmond	United Kingdom	The steamship ran aground and sank off the Covesea Skerries Lighthouse, Moray. All ten people on board were rescued by the Lossiemouth Lifeboat. She was on a voyage from Sunderland, County Durham, to Burghead, Moray.
Shamrock	United Kingdom	The derelict schooner was towed in to South Shields, County Durham by the tug Friends (United Kingdom).
Unnamed	Flag unknown	The steamship ran aground off Dulas, Anglesey, United Kingdom.
Unnamed	United Kingdom	The sloop ran aground on the West Hoyle Bank, in Liverpool Bay.
Unnamed	Flag unknown	The paddle steamer ran aground south of Moelfre Island, Anglesey.

== 11 November ==
List of shipwrecks: 11 November 1874
Ship	State	Description
Adelaide Norris	United States	The ship caught fire at Buenos Aires, Argentina. The fire was extinguished with the assistance of a French Navy warship.
Charles Louis	France	The ship was wrecked near "Vaumedons". She was on a voyage from La Rochelle, Loire-Inférieure to "Dahoust".
Constance	Norway	The barque was driven ashore at Fredrikshavn, Denmark. She was on a voyage from Luleå, Sweden to Dieppe, Seine-Inférieure, France.
Gabrielle	France	The steamship was driven ashore near the Saint-Mathieu Lighthouse, Finistère. She was on a voyage from Bordeaux, Gironde to Rouen, Seine-Infériure.
Leckwith	United Kingdom	The steamship ran aground at Bilbao, Spain. Although condemned and sold, she was refloated on 26 November.
Lennie	United States	The ship was driven ashore at Savannah, Georgia. She was on a voyage from Cardiff to Savannah. She was refloated the next day.
Monita	Germany	The schooner was wrecked at Thisted, Denmark. Her crew were rescued. She was on a voyage from Newcastle upon Tyne, Northumberland, United Kingdom to Flensburg.
Pecheur	France	The schooner was driven ashore near Gravelines, Nord.
Said Bin Sultan	United Kingdom	The ship was driven ashore at Paraíba, Brazil. She was on a voyage from Liverpool, Lancashire to Buenos Aires, Argentina. She was consequently condemned.
Viking	United Kingdom	The steamship was driven ashore at "Cape St. Michael", near Varennes, Quebec. She was on a voyage from Montreal, Quebec, Canada to Glasgow, Renfrewshire. She was refloated on 16 November and taken in the Quebec City the next day.

== 12 November ==
List of shipwrecks: 12 p 1874
Ship	State	Description
Achilles, and Sequens	Germany	The brig Achilles was run into by the tug Sequens at Swinemünde and was severely damaged. She was on a voyage from Liepāja, Russia to Schiedam, South Holland, Netherlands. She was towed in to Swiemünde in a leaky condition. Sequens was towed in to Swinemünde in a sinking condition and beached.
Ann Rankin	United Kingdom	The barque was driven ashore and wrecked at Filey, Yorkshire. Her crew were rescued.
Concurrent	Germany	The ship was driven ashore at Lemvig. She was on a voyage from Brake to Fredrikstad, Norway.
Corinna	United Kingdom	The schooner was driven ashore and wrecked at Filey. Her five crew were rescued by the Filey Lifeboat.
Daybreak	United Kingdom	The barque ran aground on the Gunfleet Sand, in the North Sea off the coast of Essex. She was on a voyage from Gävle, Sweden to London. She was refloated with the assistance of four smacks and assisted in to the River Colne.
Gerard Pieter	Netherlands	The ship ran aground east of Java, Netherlands East Indies and was wrecked. She was on a voyage from Newcastle upon Tyne, Northumberland, United Kingdom to Surabaya, Netherlands East Indies.
Hollandia	Netherlands	The brig was driven ashore on Terschelling, Friesland. Her crew were rescued. She was on a voyage from Riga, Russia to Harlingen, Friesland.
Jane Cargill	United Kingdom	The barque caught fire at Sunderland, County Durham.
Johanna Catarina	Germany	The ship sank off Sylt. She was on a voyage from Bergen, Norway to Hamburg.
Nöjet	(Russian Empire) Grand Duchy of Finland	The ship ran aground at Ventava, Courland Governorate. She was on a voyage from Skellefteå, Sweden to Wismar, Germany.
Robert Bruce	United States	The fishing schooner was lost returning from the Grand Banks. Crew saved.

== 13 November ==
List of shipwrecks: 13 November 1874
Ship	State	Description
Clans	United Kingdom	The ship ran aground on the East Hoyle Bank, in Liverpool Bay and sank. Her crew were rescued by the Hoylake Lifeboat.
Franklin	France	The barque was abandoned in the North Sea 10 nautical miles (19 km) off Heligoland. Her crew were rescued. She was on a voyage from Kronstadt, Russia to Rochester, Kent, United Kingdom. She subsequently came ashore on Heligoland and was wrecked.
Friend	United Kingdom	The brig was driven ashore and wrecked on the Trenance Rocks, near Newquay, Cornwall with the loss of all three crew.
Naomi	United Kingdom	The ship was driven ashore at Pendennis Castle, Cornwall. She was on a voyage from Plymouth, Devon to the Bristol Channel. She was refloated with assistance from the tug Rapid (United Kingdom) and taken in to Falmouth, Cornwall in a leaky condition.
Paragon	United Kingdom	The schooner was wrecked on the Noordwal. Her crew survived. She was on a voyage from Ipswich, Suffolk to Antwerp, Belgium.
Unnamed	United Kingdom	The Thames barge collided with Blackfriars Railway Bridge, London and sank. No crew were aboard at the time.

== 14 November ==
List of shipwrecks: 14 November 1874
Ship	State	Description
Anne	United Kingdom	The schooner ran aground and was wrecked at Ballyshannon, County Donegal.
Bernard Knieper	Germany	The ship was wrecked off Wierum, Friesland with some loss of life. She was on a voyage from Norway to Papenburg.
Borussia, and Sirius	Germany	The steamships collided at Stolpemünde. Borussia sank; three of her twelve crew were reported missing. Sirius was severely damaged. She was beached.
Cornuvia	United Kingdom	The ship was driven ashore near Adelaide, South Australia. She was on a voyage from London to Adelaide.
Elsus	United Kingdom	The schooner ran aground on the East Hoyle Bank, in Liverpool Bay and sank. Her crew were rescued by the Hoylake Lifeboat. She was on a voyage from the River Duddon to Chester, Cheshire.
Hillmann Scharstorf	Germany	The ship ran aground on the Wierummergronden, off the coast of Friesland, Netherlands and was wrecked. Her crew landed on Ameland, Friesland.
Jean Baptiste Marie	France	The lugger was run down by the steamship Emma Henriette (France) and sank near La Rochelle, Charente-Inférieure. Jean Baptiste Marie was on a voyage from Hull, Yorkshire, United Kingdom to La Rochelle.
Kalstad	Norway	The barque was driven ashore near Grimsby, Lincolnshire, United Kingdom. She was on a voyage from Kragerø to Hull. She was refloated on 16 November and taken in to Hull in a leaky condition.
Mie Figlie	Austria-Hungary	The barque ran aground on the Premuda Rocks, in the Adriatic Sea. She was on a voyage from Trieste to Oran, Algeria.

== 15 November ==
List of shipwrecks: 15 November 1874
Ship	State	Description
Agricola	United Kingdom	The brig was driven ashore at North Sunderland, Northumberland. She was refloated and resumed her voyage.
Despatch	United Kingdom	The steamship foundered 12 nautical miles (22 km) off "Alam el Roum". Her crew were rescued. She was on a voyage from Alexandria, Egypt to Hull, Yorkshire.
Eduard	Germany	The schooner ran aground on Læsø, Denmark. She was on a voyage from Danzig to South Shields, County Durham, United Kingdom. She was refloated and towed in to Fredrikshavn, Denmark.
Eliza Metzler	Germany	The barque ran aground on the Gislof, off Trelleborg, Sweden. She was on a voyage from Stettin to Bordeaux, Gironde, France. She was later refloated and taken in to Copenhagen, Denmark.
Gerent	United Kingdom	The ship was driven ashore and wrecked in the Rio Grande.
Ruth	United Kingdom	The schooner ran aground on the Jordan Flats, in Liverpool Bay. Her crew were rescued by the Formby Lifeboat. She was on a voyage from Liverpool, Lancashire to Fishguard, Pembrokeshire.
Sally	United Kingdom	The smack was run down and sunk in the Bristol Channel by Spartan (United Kingdom) with the loss of one of her two crew.
Thomas and Elizabeth	United Kingdom	The ship ran aground off Clevedon, Somerset. Her crew were rescued. She was on a voyage from Dundalk, County Louth to Bristol, Gloucestershire. She broke in two on 22 November.
Woodlark	United Kingdom	The steamship was driven ashore and wrecked at Hellevoetsluis, Zeeland, Netherlands. Her crew were rescued. She was on a voyage from Sulina, Ottoman Empire to Rotterdam, South Holland, Netherlands.

== 16 November ==
List of shipwrecks: 16 November 1874
Ship	State	Description
Charles	United Kingdom	The schooner was driven ashore, capsized and was wrecked at Redcar, Yorkshire. Her crew were rescued by a fishing coble. She was on a voyage from Leith, Lothian to London.
Charlotte	United Kingdom	The schooner was wrecked on the Corton Sand, in the North Sea off the coast of Suffolk. Her crew were rescued. She was refloated and towed in to Great Yarmouth, Norfolk in a severely leaky condition.
Chillingham	United Kingdom	The ship departed from Lewes, Delaware, United States for the River Tyne. No further trace, presumed foundered with the loss of all hands.
Cymbeline	United Kingdom	The ship was driven ashore at Ipswich, Suffolk.
Fides	United Kingdom	The ship ran aground on the Sazalaity Spit, in the Black Sea. She was refloated.
Grace Millie	United Kingdom	The barquentine ran aground on the Shipwash Sand, in the North Sea off the coast of Suffolk. Her crew took to a boat; they were rescued the next day by Violet (United Kingdom. Grace Millie subsequently sank. Grace Millie was on a voyage from "Cleftercek" to Londonderry.
Hendrika Ebelina	Netherlands	The schooner was wrecked in the Friesche Gat. Her crew were rescued by a pilot cutter. She was on a voyage from Newcastle upon Tyne, Northumberland, United Kingdom to Groningen.
Jacob Barnardus	Sweden	The ship collided with the steamship Lion (United Kingdom) and sank in the North Sea. Jacob Barnardus was on a voyage from Stockholm to Naples, Italy.
John Middleton, and Letteria	United Kingdom; Italy)	The steamship John Middleton collided with the brig Letteria and ran aground at Kertch, Russia. Letteria was severely damaged.
Lucy Chandos	United Kingdom	The ship was damaged by fire at Sunderland, County Durham.
Maria Gaggina	Italy	The ship ran aground at Nantes, Loire-Inférieure, France. She was refloated.
Rio Tejo	Portugal	The steamship ran aground at Porto. She was on a voyage from Le Havre, Seine-Inférieure, France to Porto. She was refloated.
Try Again	United Kingdom	The schooner was sighted off Helsingør, Denmark whilst on a voyage from Narva, Russia to Dundee, Forfarshire. No further trace, presumed foundered with the loss of all seven crew.
William Atkins	United Kingdom	The ship was driven ashore at Cairnbulg, Aberdeenshire. Her crew were rescued by a lifeboat. She was on a voyage from Liverpool, Lancashire to Leith.

== 17 November ==
List of shipwrecks: 17 November 1874
Ship	State	Description
Ann and Mary	United Kingdom	The schooner ran aground on the Longsand, in the North Sea off the coast of Essex. She was on a voyage from Tayport, Fife to Barbados. She was refloated on 19 November and taken in to Dover, Kent.
City of Edinburgh, and French Empire	United Kingdom	City of Edinburgh collided with the steamship French Empire off the Hooghly Lightship ( Trinity House) and both sank. City of Edinburgh was on a voyage from Edinburgh, Lothian to Calcutta, India. One of her 29 crew was lost. French Empire was on a voyage from Aden to Calcutta. Fifteen of her 22 crew were rescued, seven were drowned.
Cospatrick	United Kingdom	The full-rigged ship caught fire and sank off the Cape of Good Hope with the loss of 469 lives. Only three people survived. She was on a voyage from Gravesend, Kent to Auckland, New Zealand.
Empire	United States	The steamship broke in two and sank at Philadelphia, Pennsylvania, with the loss of about 30 lives. She was on a voyage from New Orleans, Louisiana, to Philadelphia.
Esperance	Flag unknown	The ship was driven ashore and wrecked at "Oxby".
Grazie	Austria-Hungary	The brig was driven ashore at Seraglio Point, Ottoman Empire. She was on a voyage from New York, United States to Odesa, Russia.
L. J. Enthoven	Netherlands	The ship was driven ashore. She was on a voyage from Singapore, Straits Settlements to Liverpool, Lancashire, United Kingdom. She was refloated and put back to Singapore.
Malvina	United Kingdom	The ship sank at Great Yarmouth, Norfolk. Her crew were rescued. She was on a voyage from Port Madoc, Caernarfonshire to Hamburg, Germany.

== 18 November ==
List of shipwrecks: 18 November 1874
Ship	State	Description
Cornish Girl	United Kingdom	The schooner ran aground of Hellevoetsluis, Zeeland, Netherlands. She was on a voyage from Cephalonia, Greece to Rotterdam, South Holland, Netherlands. She was refloated with assistance.
Jane	(United Kingdom of Great Britain and Ireland) Jersey	The ship was abandoned off the Pratas Islands. Her crew were rescued.
King Ja Ja	United Kingdom	The steamship was driven ashore at Crosby, Lancashire. She was refloated on23 November and taken in to Liverpool, Lancashire.
Marie Leonie	France	The ship was driven ashore at Dunkirk, Nord.
Ningpo	United Kingdom	The steamship ran aground off Brecker Point, China. She was on a voyage from Hong Kong to Shanghai, China. She was refloated and put back to Hong Kong for repairs.
Numa	Italy	The ship was driven ashore near Dunkirk. She was on a voyage from Livorno to Antwerp, Belgium.
Oliver	Belgium	The schooner collided with Arthur (Norway) and sank at Antwerp. Her crew were rescued.
Right-of-Way	United Kingdom	The ship was driven ashore at Cresswell, Northumberland. Her crew were rescued. She was on a voyage from Lossiemouth, Moray to Sunderland, County Durham.

== 19 November ==
List of shipwrecks: 19 November 1874
Ship	State	Description
Cesare	United Kingdom	The barque was wrecked at Alexandria, Egypt with the loss of all but three of her crew. She was on a voyage from Cardiff, Glamorgan to Alexandria.
Charles H. Oulton	United Kingdom	The ship ran aground on the Burbo Bank, in Liverpool Bay. She was on a voyage from Harbour Grace, Newfoundland Colony to Liverpool, Lancashire. She was refloated with the assistance of a tug and towed in to Liverpool.
Garthorne	United Kingdom	The steamship ran aground on the Sazainatz Spit, in the Black Sea.
Louise	Germany	The ship departed from Turku, Finland for Southampton, Hampshire, United Kingdom. No further trace, presumed foundered with the loss of all hands.
Lyttelton	New Zealand	The barque was wrecked in Algoa Bay. Her crew were rescued.
Mysore	United Kingdom	The ship collided with the steamship Great Britain (United Kingdom in the Sloyne and was beached on the Pluckington Bank, in Liverpool Bay. Mysore was on a voyage from Liverpool to Calcutta, India. She was refloated.
Cutter belonging to HMS Aurora	Royal Navy	The cutter was run down and sunk in the Clyde by the paddle steamer Duke of Leinster (United Kingdom) with the loss of fifteen of the 25 people on board.

== 20 November ==
List of shipwrecks: 20 November 1874
Ship	State	Description
Admiral	Germany	The full-rigged ship caught fire at Bremen.
Anna	United Kingdom	The ship departed from Cardiff, Glamorgan for Villefranche-sur-Mer, Alpes Maritimes. No further trace, presumed foundered with the loss of all hands.
Caroline	United Kingdom	The ship ran aground at Sunderland, County Durham. She was on a voyage from Kragerø, Norway to Sunderland. She was refloated and taken in to Sunderland in a leaky condition.
Celia	Sweden	The barque ran aground off Porkkalanniemi, Grand Duchy of Finland. She was refloated.
Emilie	Germany	The schooner was wrecked at Monster, South Holland, Netherlands. Her crew were rescued by a lifeboat. She was on a voyage from Stralsund to Rotterdam, South Holland.
Grappler, and Slasher	United Kingdom	The tug Slasher collided with the barque Mary Moore (United Kingdom) and was abandoned by her crew, who were rescued by the barque Great Britain (United Kingdom. Grappler and the Mersey Ferry Lancashire (United Kingdom) attempted to take Slasher in tow, but Grappler collided with Slasher and both foundered. One person was drowned.
Ilena	United Kingdom	The barque was driven ashore in the Svenska Högarna, Sweden and sank.
James	United Kingdom	The schooner was wrecked on Ailsa Craig. Her crew were rescued. She was on a voyage from Dundalk, County Louth to Ardrossan, Ayrshire.
Jeune Henri	United Kingdom	The ship foundered between "Hoedie" and "Four", France. She was on a voyage from Cardiff, Glamorgan, United Kingdom to Nantes, Loire-Inférieure.
Maria Luck	United Kingdom	The barque ran aground at Gaza, Egypt.
Marshal Pellissier	Denmark	The barque was driven ashore on Skagen. Her crew were rescued. She was on a voyage from Copenhagen, Denmark to Hull, Yorkshire.
Medora	Courland Governorate	The barque was driven ashore at Maldonado, Uruguay. She was on a voyage from Paysandú, Uruguay to Ventava.
Oriental	United Kingdom	The ship was driven ashore and wrecked at Gioia Tauro, Italy with the loss of five of her seven crew. She was on a voyage from Cardiff, Glamorgan to Messina, Sicily, Italy.
Rouen	United Kingdom	The ship was run down and sunk off the Dudgeon Sandbank, in the North Sea by the steamship George Wascol. Her crew were rescued by George Wascol and the steamship Hirondelle (France). Rouen was on a voyage from Blyth, Northumberland to London.
Tom Bell	United Kingdom	The ship ran aground on the Monsciar Reef, in the Mediterranean Sea off Malta and was abandoned by her crew.
Ville de Frontegnac	France	The barque ran aground at Hellevoetsluis, Zeeland, Netherlands. She was on a voyage from Panama City, United States of Colombia to Rotterdam, South Holland, Netherlands.

== 21 November ==
List of shipwrecks: 21 p 1874
Ship	State	Description
Marie Charlotte	Sweden	The ship was driven ashore at Ostby, Öland. She was on a voyage from Saint Petersburg, Russia to Ystad.
The Foundling	United Kingdom	The ship was destroyed by fire in the Atlantic Ocean. All on board were rescued. She was on a voyage from Liverpool, Lancashire to Bombay, India.
Trent	United Kingdom	The steamship ran aground at Savannah, Georgia, United States. She was on a voyage from Savannah to Liverpool. She was later refloated and put back to Savannah.

== 22 November ==
List of shipwrecks: 22 November 1874
Ship	State	Description
Dove	United Kingdom	The smack was damaged by fire at Ryde, Isle of Wight. She was on a voyage from Portsmouth, Hampshire to Ryde.
Louis C. Madeira	United States	The brig was wrecked at Bagnara Calabra, Sicily, Italy with the loss of two of her five crew.
Noemi	United Kingdom	The full-rigged ship was wrecked on the coast of Calabria, Italy. Her crew were rescued.
Nummer Eins	Germany	The brig collided with the steamship Palermo (United Kingdom). She was on a voyage from Riga, Russia to Appledore, Devon, United Kingdom. Nummer Eins was towed in to Helsingør, Denmark in a sinking condition.
Orient	United Kingdom	The brigantine was driven ashore on Anticosti Island, Nova Scotia, Canada with the loss of fourteen of her sixteen crew.
SMS Saida	Austro-Hungarian Navy	The schooner was driven ashore and wrecked at "Rampon", Sicily with the loss of a crew member.
Unnamed	Italy	The ship was wrecked on the coast of Sicily with the loss of all hands.
Unnamed	United States	The ship was wrecked on the coast of Calabria with the loss of two of her crew.
Unnamed	Germany	The schooner was wrecked on the coast of Calabria with the loss of all hands.

== 23 November ==
List of shipwrecks: 23 November 1874
Ship	State	Description
Anna Elizabeth	Netherlands	The barque was driven ashore on Amager, Denmark. She was on a voyage from Saint Petersburg, Russia to Amsterdam, North Holland.
Baltic	United Kingdom	The steamship was damaged by fire at Leith, Lothian.
Caroline	United Kingdom	The schooner collided with the steamship Palayo (Spain and sank in the River Mersey. Her three crew were rescued by Palayo. Caroline was on a voyage from the Weston Point Docks, Cheshire to Wicklow.
Caroline	Norway	The barque struck the Morte Stone and was severely damaged. She was on a voyage from "Kutka" to Cardiff, Glamorgan, United Kingdom of Great Britain and Ireland. She arrived at Cardiff on 26 November.
Georgetown	(United Kingdom of Great Britain and Ireland) British Guiana	The ship was damaged by fire at Demerara. She was placed under repair.
George Washington	United Kingdom	The barque caught fire at Shanghai, China and was scuttled.
Isabel	United Kingdom	The ship ran aground at Prestatyn, Flintshire and was severely damaged. She was on a voyage from Dieppe, Seine-Inférieure, France to Prestatyn.
John Richards	United Kingdom	The ship ran aground on the Milltown Bank, in the Belfast Lough. She was on a voyage from Belfast, County Antrim to Ayr. She was refloated and resumed her voyage.
Mabel, and Ran	United Kingdom; Sweden	The steamship Mabel collided with the steamship Ran and sank in the Baltic Sea. Her crew, between 20 and 30 people, were rescued. She was on a voyage from Kronstadt, Russia to Wolgast, Germany. Ran was severely damaged. She put in to Reval, Russia.
Solide	United Kingdom	The ship departed from Cardiff for Mahón, Spain. No further trace, presumed foundered with the loss of all hands.
St. Hilda	United Kingdom	The steamship was run down and sunk in the River Thames at Blackwall, Middlesex. She was refloated on 30 November.

== 24 November ==
List of shipwrecks: 24 November 1874
Ship	State	Description
Abbotsford, and Indus	United Kingdom	The steamships collided in the English Channel off Dover, Kent and were both severely damaged. Abbotsford was on a voyage from New York to Antwerp, Belgium. Indus was on a voyage from the River Thames to Southampton, Hampshire.
Industrie	France	The schooner was wrecked on the Nash Sands, in the Bristol Channel. Her six crew survived. She was on a voyage from Nantes, Loire-Inférieure to Gloucester, United Kingdom.
Kong Oscar II	Norway	The ship ran aground at Bolderāja, Russia. She was on a voyage from Newcastle upon Tyne, Northumberland, United Kingdom to Bolderāja. She was refloated on 29 November and taken in to Riga, Russia.
Ragna	Norway	The ship departed from Howdon, Northumberland for Christiania. No further trace, presumed foundered with the loss of all hands.

== 25 November ==
List of shipwrecks: 25 November 1874
Ship	State	Description
Berar	United Kingdom	The steamship departed from Malta for Le Havre, Seine-Inférieure, France. No further trace, presumed foundered with the loss of all twenty crew.
Checco	United Kingdom	The barque was driven ashore at Suedia, Ottoman Empire.
Diligence	United Kingdom	The schooner was driven ashore at Middleton, County Durham. She was on a voyage from Lowestoft, Suffolk to Hartlepool, County Durham.
German Emperor	United Kingdom	The steamship was run into in the River Thames and was beached at Gravesend, Kent.
Kate Agnes	United Kingdom	The ship ran aground in the River Tees and was severely damaged. She was on a voyage from Saint John, New Brunswick to Stockton-on-Tees, County Durham.
Lizzie Tindall	United Kingdom	The ship was driven ashore at Donna Nook, Lincolnshire. She was on a voyage from Vyborg, Grand Duchy of Finland to Grimsby, Lincolnshire.
Sandringham	United Kingdom	The steamship ran aground at Dunkirk, Nord, France. She was on a voyage from Taganrog, Russia to Dunkirk. She was refloated.

== 26 November ==
List of shipwrecks: 26 November 1874
Ship	State	Description
Assyrian	United Kingdom	The ship ran aground at Yenikale, Russia. She was refloated the next day.
Bermuda	United Kingdom	The brig was driven ashore at Sunderland, County Durham. Her crew were rescued.
James Muir	(Canada)	The ship was driven ashore and wrecked at Westport, New York, United States. She was on a voyage from Annapolis, Maryland, United States to Montevideo, Uruguay.
Precursor	United Kingdom	The steamship ran aground at "Kamich Baroom", Russia. She was refloated.
Saxon	United Kingdom	The steamship was driven ashore on Saltholm, Denmark. She was on a voyage from London to Swinemünde, Germany. She was refloated and resumed her voyage.
William	United Kingdom	The schooner was driven ashore and wrecked at Sunderland. Her five crew were rescued by rocket apparatus.

== 27 November ==
List of shipwrecks: 27 November 1874
Ship	State	Description
Adelgrunde	Germany	The barque was driven ashore in the Elbe at Wittenbergen.
Burmese	United Kingdom	The steamship ran aground on the Cani Rocks, in the Mediterranean Sea off Tunis, Beylik of Tunis. She was on a voyage from Ceylon to Gravesend, Kent. She was refloated and resumed her voyage.
Cambrai	United Kingdom	The steamship ran aground in the River Lee. She was on a voyage from Cork to Glasgow, Renfrewshire.
Helga	Germany	The full-rigged ship was driven ashore in the Elbe at Wittenbergen.
John and Ann	Russia	The schooner was towed in to St. Andrews, Fife, United Kingdom in a waterlogged condition.
Kingmoore	United Kingdom	The steamship was driven ashore in the Elbe at Wittenbergen.
Lady Panmure	United Kingdom	The schooner was beached in Duart Bay.
Success	United Kingdom	The ship departed from Liverpool, Lancashire for Shanghai, China. No further trace, presumed foundered with the loss of all hands.
Thomas Dugdale	United Kingdom	The steamship ran aground at Fleetwood, Lancashire. Her passengers were taken off by fishing boats. Thomas Dugdale was on a voyage from Belfast, County Antrim to Fleetwood. She was refloated with the assistance of the tug Wyre (United Kingdom), and taken in to Fleetwood, where she sank. Thomas Dugdale was refloated on 4 December. She was taken in to Barrow-in-Furness, Lancashire for repairs.
Tirsah	(Dominion of Newfoundland) Newfoundland Colony	The ship was wrecked off Kythira, Greece. Her crew were rescued.

== 28 November ==
List of shipwrecks: 28 November 1874
Ship	State	Description
Deerhound	United Kingdom	The barque ran aground off Dungeness, Kent. She was on a voyage from London to Shanghai, China. She was refloated and put in to The Downs in a severely leaky condition.
Fruiterer	United Kingdom	The schooner struck a rock off Molène, Finistère, France and was abandoned. She was on a voyage from Taganrog, Russia to Falmouth, Cornwall. She was subsequently taken in to Brest, Finistère.
Isabella, and Viscount Kingsnorth	United Kingdom	The schooner Viscount Kingsnorth collided with the schooner Isabella and sank 3 nautical miles (5.6 km) west of Corsewall Point, Wigtownshire. Her crew were rescued. She was on a voyage from Troon to Belfast, County Antrim. Isabella sank with the loss of all three crew. She was on a voyage from Troon to Stranraer, Wigtownshire.
Jessie	United Kingdom	The ship was driven ashore at Falsterbo, Sweden. She was on a voyage from Stettin, Germany to Malmö, Sweden. She was refloated and resumed her voyage.
Magdalene	France	The lugger was wrecked at Camaret-sur-Mer, Finistère. She was on a voyage from Cardiff, Glamorgan, United Kingdom to Nantes, Loire-Inférieure.
Mirzapore	United Kingdom	The steamship was driven ashore at Gravesend, Kent. She was on a voyage from London to Calcutta, India.
Ranger	United Kingdom	The schooner struck Pattinson's Rock, off the Mull of Kintyre, Argyllshire and sank. Her crew were rescued. She was on a voyage from Troon, Ayrshire to Londonderry.

== 29 November ==
List of shipwrecks: 29 November 1874
Ship	State	Description
Almora	United Kingdom	The ship was driven ashore in the River Thames at Blackwall, Middlesex. She was refloated with the assistance of three tugs and docked.
Anne	Netherlands	The schooner was driven ashore and wrecked at Granton, Lothian, United Kingdom. All seven people on board were rescued by the Coastguard. She was on a voyage from Harlingen, Friesland to Granton.
Anne	United Kingdom	The ship was driven ashore and wrecked at Kirkwall, Orkney Islands. Her crew were rescued. She was on a voyage from Málaga, Spain to Aberdeen.
Annie	United Kingdom	The brig foundered in the Irish Sea off the Connibeg Lightship ( Trinity House ). Her crew were rescued by the Connibeg Lightship. Annie was on a voyage from Newport, Monmouthshire to Waterford.
Auld Reekie	United Kingdom	The steamship was driven ashore at Tayport, Fife. All on board were rescued. She was on a voyage from Tayport to Broughty Ferry, Forfarshire.
Caroline Lesure	United Kingdom	The brig was driven ashore and wrecked at Blyth, Northumberland. Her crew were rescued.
Compass	United Kingdom	The schooner was driven ashore and wrecked at Crail, Fife with the loss of three of her five crew.
Domilita	United Kingdom	The schooner capsized near Runcorn, Cheshire.
Donna Maria	United Kingdom	The brigantine was driven ashore in Dundrum Bay. Her five crew were rescued by the Tyrella Lifeboat. She was on a voyage from Liverpool, Lancashire to Belfast, County Antrim.
Estelle	United Kingdom	The ship departed from Lagos, Lagos Colony for Liverpool. No further trace, presumed foundered with the loss of all hands.
Harriet	United Kingdom	The sloop was driven ashore and wrecked at Scoughall, Lothian. Her crew were rescued.
Lady Anne	United Kingdom	The ship was driven ashore and wrecked at Seaham, County Durham with the loss of her captain. Three survivors were rescued by the Seaham Lifeboat and the Coastguard using rocket apparatus. She was on a voyage from Wells-next-the-Sea, Norfolk to Stockton-on-Tees, County Durham.
Lancashire Lass	United Kingdom	The ship was driven ashore at St. John's Point, County Down with the loss of two of her three crew. She was on a voyage from Drogheda, County Louth to Workington, Cumberland.
La Plata	United Kingdom	The steamship foundered in the Bay of Biscay with the loss of 58 of the 74 people on board. Fourteen of the survivors were rescued by Gare Loch (United Kingdom) and two by the cutter William Renkelzoon (Netherlands). La Plata was on a voyage from Gravesend, Kent to the Rio Grande do Sul.
Laurel	(United Kingdom of Great Britain and Ireland) Isle of Man	The smack was abandoned off Ramsey. Her three crew were rescued by the Ramsey Lifeboat Two Sisters ( Royal National Lifeboat Institution).
Lavinia	(United Kingdom of Great Britain and Ireland) Guernsey	The brig was driven ashore at South Shields, County Durham. Her crew were rescued by the South Shields Lifeboats. Northumberland and Tom Parry (both Royal National Lifeboat Institution) Lavinia was on a voyage from London to South Shields. She was refloated on 8 December with the assistance of tugs and towed in to South Shields.
Lion	France	The barque ran aground on the Longsand, in the North Sea off the coast of Essex, United Kingdom and was abandoned by her crew. She was on a voyage from Bremerhaven, Germany to New Orleans, Louisiana, United States. She was refloated with the aid of a smack and taken in to Harwich, Essex.
Maria	United Kingdom	The yacht was abandoned off Ramsey. Her four crew were rescued by the Ramsey Lifeboat Two Sisters ( Royal National Lifeboat Institution).
Mary Ann	United Kingdom	The schooner was driven ashore at Seaham, County Durham with the loss of her captain. Three crew were rescued.
Meaburn	United Kingdom	The schooner was driven ashore at Leith, Lothian. Her crew were rescued. She was on a voyage from Maldon, Essex to Sunderland, County Durham.
Osprey	United Kingdom	The schooner was driven ashore and wrecked at Dungeness, Kent. She was on a voyage from Halifax, Nova Scotia, Canada to London. She was refloated on 1 December and towed in to Dover, Kent in a sinking condition.
Praecis	United Kingdom	The barque was abandoned in the Atlantic Ocean with the loss of two of her crew. She was on a voyage from Berdianski, Russia to Falmouth, Cornwall, United Kingdom.
Scylla	United Kingdom	The schooner was driven ashore and wrecked north of South Shields. Her six crew were rescued. She was on a voyage from London to the River Tyne.
St. Albans	United Kingdom	The schooner was driven ashore at South Shields with the loss of two lives. She was on a voyage from Rotterdam, South Holland, Netherlands to the River Tyne.
Star	United Kingdom	The schooner was wrecked at Upgang, Yorkshire. Her crew were rescued by the Coastguard using rocket apparatus. She was on a voyage from Margate, Kent to the River Tyne.
Sultan	United Kingdom	The smack was driven ashore and wrecked at Portland, Dorset. Her crew were rescued.
Swallow	United Kingdom	The schooner was driven ashore and wrecked at Blyth. Her crew were rescued.
Tenasserim	United Kingdom	The ship was deiven ashore at Gravesend, Kent. She was on a voyage from London to Calcutta, India. She was refloated with the assistance of a number of tugs.
Torrance	United Kingdom	The brig was driven ashore and wrecked north of Carnlough, County Antrim, Ireland; the master and two crew were drowned.
Truro	United Kingdom	The schooner was driven ashore at Margate, Kent. She was on a voyage from Truro, Cornwall to London.
Veteran	United Kingdom	The barque was driven ashore and wrecked at Fraserburgh, Aberdeenshire with the loss of ten of the 21 people on board. Eight of the survivors were rescued by rocket apparatus. Veteran was on a voyage from South Shields to Pensacola, Florida, United States.
Young John	United Kingdom	The Yorkshire Billyboy foundered off the mouth of the River Tees with the loss of all hands.
42	France	The fishing lugger was lost at Brest, Finistère with the loss of all nineteen crew.

== 30 November ==
List of shipwrecks: 30 November 1874
Ship	State	Description
Albion	United Kingdom	The fishing boat was driven ashore and wrecked at Buckhaven, Fife.
Ann	United Kingdom	The coaster was driven ashore at Seaham, County Durham with the loss of her captain.
Cito	Denmark	The ship was driven ashore and wrecked at Ross, Northumberland, United Kingdom. She was on a voyage from Schiedam, South Holland, Netherlands to Granton, Lothian.
Erik	United Kingdom	The brig was wrecked off Deerness, Orkney Islands with the loss of two of her crew. She was on a voyage rom Chynoweth, Cornwall to "Tolly". Also reported as Erin on a voyage from Kronstadt, Russia to Liverpool, Lancashire.
Huldah	United Kingdom	The schooner was wrecked on the Doom Bar. Her five crew were rescued by the Padstow Lifeboat Albert Edward ( Royal National Lifeboat Institution). Huldah was on a voyage from Southampton, Hampshire to Cardiff, Glamorgan.
Josephine	Belgium	The ship was abandoned in the North Sea 110 nautical miles (200 km) off Heligoland. Her crew were rescued by the steamship Middleton (United Kingdom). Josephine was on a voyage from Warkworth, Northumberland to Harburg, Germany.
Lavinia	(United Kingdom of Great Britain and Ireland) Guernsey	The schooner was abandoned in the North Sea 30 nautical miles (56 km) off Tynemouth Castle, Northumberland. Her crew were rescued by a barque.
Lochlyn	United Kingdom	The schooner was driven ashore at Rye Harbour, Sussex.
Kathleen Mary	United Kingdom	The ship departed from Gibraltar for Cardiff. No further trace, presumed foundered with the loss of all hands.
Morning Srar	United Kingdom	The barque ran aground on the Cross Sand, in the North Sea off the coast of Norfolk. She was on a voyage from London to Newcastle upon Tyne, Northumberland. She was refloated and resumed her voyage, but put in to Bridlington, Yorkshire in a leaky condition.
Nancy	United Kingdom	The smack was driven ashore and wrecked at Welcombe, Devon with the loss of all four people on board.
Perseverance	United Kingdom	The fishing boat capsized and sank in the North Sea off Eyemouth, Berwickshire with the loss of all seven crew.
Praecis	Norway	The barque was abandoned in the Atlantic Ocean with the loss of two of her nine crew. Survivors were rescued by Palestine (United Kingdom). Praecis was on a voyage from Berdianski, Russia to Falmouth, Cornwall, United Kingdom.
Svanen	Norway	The brig was driven ashore and wrecked at Newton, Northumberland. Her crew were rescued by rocket apparatus.

== Unknown date ==
List of shipwrecks: Unknown date in November 1874
Ship	State	Description
Ambassador	United Kingdom	The ship was driven ashore near Lemvig, Denmark.
Anna Ivers	Germany	The brig was wrecked at Minatitlan, Mexico before 9 November.
Annie Vernon	United Kingdom	The steamship collided with the steamship Edward Williams (United Kingdom) and sank at Huelva, Spain in early November. Her crew were rescued. She was refloated on 8 December.
Arabia	United Kingdom	The steamship struck rocks near Amherstburg, Ontario, Canada before 26 November. She was refloated and found to be severely leaky.
Archimede	Italy	The barque sank in the Strait of Messina with the loss of all hands.
Artisan	United Kingdom	The brigantine departed from Pomaron, Portugal for the River Tyne. No further trace, presumed foundered with the loss of all seven crew.
Atlantic	United Kingdom	The schooner ran aground at Saint-Malo, Ille-et-Vilaine.
Ava	Norway	The brig was damaged by fire at Wilmington, Delaware, United States.
Belle Anais	France	The ship was driven ashore and wrecked at Maldonado, Uruguay. She was on a voyage rom Le Havre, Seine-Inférieure to Maldonado.
Bravo	United Kingdom	The fishing smack foundered in the North Sea with the loss of all hands.
Brennus	Norway	The brig was abandoned in the Dogger Bank in a waterlogged condition. Her crew were rescued by Allan (United Kingdom). Brennus was on a voyage from Drammen to Boulogne, Pas-de-Calais, France. She was subsequently discovered by Fortuna (United Kingdom), which put three of her cre aboard.
British Standard	United Kingdom	The ship was wrecked at St. Shott's, Newfoundland Colony. She was on a voyage from Montreal, Quebec to London.
Carleton	Canada	The ship was driven ashore at Richelieu, Quebec. She was on a voyage from Trois-Rivières, Quebec to Melbourne, Victoria. She was refloated and taken in to Quebec City.
Cedars	United Kingdom	The brig was driven ashore at Suedia, Ottoman Empire.
Centaur	United Kingdom	The ship was destroyed by fire at sea before 5 November with the loss of several of her crew. Five survivors reached Tahiti in a boat, and eight reached the Marquesas Islands in another. She was on a voyage from Liverpool, Lancashire to San Francisco, California, United States.
Charles Lawley	United Kingdom	The schooner was wrecked at Redcar, Yorkshire. She was on a voyage from Leith, Lothian to London.
Chorley	United Kingdom	The ship was driven ashore at New York, United States. She was on a voyage from Kingsport, Nova Scotia to Baltimore, Maryland, United States.
County of Perth	United Kingdom	The ship was destroyed by fire at sea. Her crew were rescued.
Clara	Russia	The brig was driven ashore on Osmussaar. She was on a voyage from Helsinki, Grand Duchy of Finland to Copenhagen, Denmark. She was refloated and taken in to Reval.
Cleughs	United Kingdom	The barque was wrecked at Cape Ray, Newfoundland Colony. She was on a voyage from Trois-Rivières to London.
Clive	United Kingdom	The steamship ran aground on a reef in the Red Sea (18°00′N 40°39′E) before 17 November. She was on a voyage from Calcutta, India to a British port. She was refloated and taken in to Suez, Egypt for repairs.
Conrad	United Kingdom	The steamship ran aground in the Suez Canal before 5 November. She was on a voyage from Southampton, Hampshire to Batavia, Netherlands East Indies.
Cordova	United States	The ship was driven ashore at Fort Stevens, Oregon. She was on a voyage from Montevideo, Uruguay to Portland, Oregon. She was refloated on 2 December.
Corneille	France	The ship was wrecked at Bimlipatam, India. Her crew were rescued.
Dauntless	United Kingdom	The ship was wrecked on Anticosti Island, Nova Scotia, Canada. Her crew were rescued. She was on a voyage from Quebec City to Bristol, Gloucestershire.
Dundee	United Kingdom	The ship was driven ashore and wrecked 13 nautical miles (24 km) from Pernambuco, Brazil. She was on a voyage from Pernambuco to an American port.
Ebenezer	United Kingdom	The ship foundered in the North Sea off Mundesley, Norfolk with the loss of all hands.
Echo	Flag unknown	The ship was driven ashore at Oristano, Sardinia, Italy. She was on a voyage from Rio de Janeiro, Brazil to Marseille, Bouches-du-Rhône, France.
Eddystone	United Kingdom	The steamship was driven ashore in the River Suir. She was refloated.
Elephanta	United Kingdom	The fishing smack was presumed to have foundered in the North Sea with the loss of all hands.
Elinor	United Kingdom	The ship was wrecked on Watling's Island, New York. She was on a voyage from London to Jamaica.
Elise	United Kingdom	The brig caught fire at sea and was abandoned. She was on a voyage from London to New London.
Elliada	Flag unknown	The barque was driven ashore at Pugwash, Nova Scotia before 18 November.
Emma Francis	United Kingdom	The brig was driven ashore at Maldonado. She was on a voyage from Paysandú, Uruguay to an English port.
Emerne	France	The steamship was wrecked at Cap d'Ambre, Madagascar. Her crew were rescued.
Esperanza	Spain	The ship was wrecked on Rose Island, Bahamas. She was on a voyage from Havana, Cuba to London.
Exemplar	United Kingdom	The ship was driven ashore near Portaferry, County Down.
Forget-me-Not	United Kingdom	The fishing lugger foundered in the North Sea with the loss of all hands.
Gem	United Kingdom	The fishing smack foundered in the North Sea with the loss of all hands.
Gezina	Netherlands	The ship was driven ashore on Vlieland, Friesland, Netherlands. She was on a voyage from Rostock, Germany to Amsterdam, North Holland.
G. G. Kidder	United States	The fishing schooner sank in a storm on the Grand Banks. Lost with all 13 crew.
Helga	United Kingdom	The ship foundered in the North Sea. Wreckage came ashore at Tønsberg, Germany.
Inverary	United Kingdom	The ship was driven ashore. She was on a voyage from Hong Kong to Callao, Peru. She was refloated and put in to Singapore, Straits Settlements on 13 November in a leaky condition.
Jemima	United Kingdom	The ship was wrecked on the coast of Ottoman Syria.
John	Flag unknown	The ship was abandoned in the Atlantic Ocean before 21 November.
John Elliott	United Kingdom	The ship was destroyed by fire. All on board were rescued. She was on a voyage from Dundee, Forfarshire to Calcutta.
Leonor	United Kingdom	The brigantine was wrecked on Strong Island, Massachusetts, United States.
Llasat	Flag unknown	The ship was wrecked at Cárdenas, Cuba before 9 November. She was on a voyage from Pensacola, Florida, United States to a Brazilian port.
Madonna Cursanniza	Austria-Hungary	The ship was wrecked on the Barbary Coast.
Maggie	United Kingdom	The steamship was wrecked on the coast of Puerto Rico.
Marie Louise	Canada	The schooner was wrecked near "Cape Magdalen". Three of her crew survived.
Martha James	United Kingdom	The schooner was abandoned in the Norwegian Sea.
Mary Bangs	United States	The clipper was wrecked near Altata, Mexico.
Minnie	United Kingdom	The schooner was driven ashore on Egilsay, Orkney Islands. Her crew were rescued. She was on a voyage from Danzig, Germany to Ayr.
Moeden	Netherlands	The ship sank off Cape Pula, Sardinia. Her crew were rescued.
Norma	Austria-Hungary	The ship was wrecked on the Barbary Coast.
O. H. van Bergen	Flag unknown	The ship was wrecked.
Palestine	United Kingdom	The ship was abandoned in the North Sea before 9 November. She was taken in to Tananger, Norway in a waterlogged condition.
ARA Pampa	Argentine Navy	The gunboat was wrecked before 12 October.
Pierre Kuyper	Germany	The barque was wrecked on Barbados.
Ponce	United Kingdom	The ship ran aground in the Southwest Pass. She was on a voyage from New Orleans, Louisiana, United States to Liverpool. She was refloated and resumed her voyage.
Princesa	Brazil	The brig was driven ashore at Maldonado.
Progress	United Kingdom	The ship ran aground in the Baltic Sea. She was on a voyage from Söderhamn, Sweden to Adelaide, South Australia. She was refloated and taken in to Tønsberg.
Providencia	Peru	The barque foundered in the Pacific Ocean. Her crew were rescued.
Robert	United Kingdom	The ship was driven ashore on Skagen, Denmark. She was on a voyage from Stettin, Germany to Peel, Isle of Man. She was refloated and towed in to Fredrikshavn, Denmark.
Salomon	Italy	The ship was wrecked near Cotrone. She was on a voyage from Licata to Venice.
Solide	Sweden	The barque ran aground. She was on a voyage from Gävle to Hull, United Kingdom. She was refloated and taken in to Strömstad.
Stad Brugge	Belgium	The steamship foundered in the North Sea with the loss of all hands. She was on a voyage from Kronstadt, Russia to Hull.
Stephen Lee	United States	The brig was abandoned in the Atlantic Ocean before 22 November.
St. Louis	United Kingdom	The steamship caught fire whilst on a voyage from New Orleans to Liverpool. Putting in to Savannah, Georgia, United States, she ran ashore on Tybee Island, Georgia.
St. Paul	Canada	The barque was wrecked in Caplin Bay before 17 November. She was on a voyage from Liverpool to Pictou, Nova Scotia.
Victoire Leonie	France	The ship was wrecked 250 nautical miles (460 km) from Saint-Louis, Senegal. She was on a voyage from Marseille, Bouches-du-Rhône to Saint-Louis.
Victorine	United Kingdom	The fishing smack was presumed to have foundered in the North Sea with the loss of all hands.
Ville de Bordeaux	France	The ship ran aground on the Colorados, off the coast of Cuba before 6 November. She was on a voyage from New Orleans to Le Havre. She subsequently broke up.
Walrus	United Kingdom	The ship was driven ashore on "Northampton Island", Newfoundland Colony. She was on refloated and taken in to Saint John's, Newfoundland Colony in a severely leaky condition.
Warrior	United Kingdom	The ship was wrecked on Anholt, Denmark. Her crew were rescued. She was on a voyage from Stettin to Sunderland, County Durham.
William Ecclys	United Kingdom	The ship was driven ashore near Fraserburgh, Aberdeenshire. Her crew were rescued. She was on a voyage from Liverpool to Leith.
Windward	United States	The ship was driven ashore at Fort Stevens. She was on a voyage from Montevideo to Portland, Oregon.
Witch of the Tees	United Kingdom	The ship foundered in the Atlantic Ocean off the Cape Verde Islands. Her eleven crew were rescued by the steamship Boyne (United Kingdom).
