= Tony Caplin =

British businessman (born 1951)

Anthony Lindsay Caplin
- Born: 1951 (age 73–74); Southport, Lancashire
- Occupation(s): British company director and former

Anthony Lindsay Caplin (born 1951 in Southport, Lancashire), a son of Abram Caplin and Vera Doris Benjamin. He is a British company director and former chief operating officer of the United Kingdom's Conservative Party.

In 2009, it was suggested that he should be appointed a peer.

He was appointed to the Public Works Loan Board by the Labour government in 2003 and was made chairman by Prime Minister David Cameron in July 2013. The board is responsible for lending money to local authorities for infrastructure projects and collecting the repayments. He resigned from this position in 2014 after it emerged he had failed to disclose being declared bankrupt in 2012.

== Former appointments ==
Positions that Caplin has previously held include:

- Chairman of William Clowes Ltd.
- Chairman of stockbrokers Panmure Gordon, from January 17, 2002 until September 30, 2009
- Board of the Medical Research Council
- Chair of North West London Hospitals NHS Trust until January 2013
- Chair of Ealing Hospital NHS Trust
- Advisor of ITI Energy Limited
- Non-Executive Chairman of Energy Technique plc until February 21, 2007
- Acting Chief Executive Officer of Disenco Energy plc from May 2008 to March 16, 2009, Chairman until March 16, 2009
- Chairman, Director Durlacher
- Managing Director of Manchester News Ltd
- President of Pacific Telesis
- Chief Executive of First City GB
- Chief Executive of Hunterprint plc
- Non-Executive Chairman of Urban Wimax Limited
- Chairman of Era plc
- Chairman of ANT Ltd from October 2002
- Non-executive chairman of G.S.Technologies Ltd
- Board of Norprint Ltd
- Board of Coppice Allupack Ltd
- Non-Executive Chairman of Dynamic Commercial Finance plc until August 2004
- Chairman of iRevolution Group plc since July 27, 2000
- Chairman of Totally plc
- Chairman of Financial Development Corporation plc
- Chairman of Alternative Networks plc from January 18, 2010 to May 18, 2012
- Non-Executive Chairman of Gladstone plc from July 11, 2005 to June 30, 2006
- Deputy Chairman of Northamber plc until December 17, 2010
- Director of Edengame
- Director of Jasmin plc
- Director of Ultramind plc
- Non-Executive Director of Hand Picked Hotels Ltd
- Director on the Advisory Panel of Inflexion Private Equity Partners LLP
- Chairman of the European Electronic Messaging Association
- Non-Executive Director of Vaccinogen Inc
- Director of Alternative Networks plc from April 2001 to May 16, 2012
- Independent Non-Executive Director of Endeavors plc (alternate name Tadpole Technology plc) from October 10, 2000 to February 2005.
- Senior independent non-executive director of Easynet Group plc
- Non-executive director of Dynamic Commercial Finance plc
- Non-executive chairman of Biscuit Internet Ltd
- Director of 2020Me Holdings Limited
- Director of IEQ plc
- Director of Bibliotech Holdings plc
- Director of Computer Monitoring Services Limited 1984
