= Expanded Program on Immunization (Philippines) =

Childhood immunization schedule

The Expanded Program on Immunization (EPI) in the Philippines began in 1976 through Presidential Decree No. 996 signed by President Ferdinand Marcos. And, in 1986, made a response to the Universal Child Immunization goal. The four major strategies include:

1. sustaining high routine Full Immunized Child (FIC) coverage of at least 90% in all provinces and cities;
2. sustaining the polio-free country for global certification;
3. eliminating measles by 2008; and
4. eliminating neonatal tetanus by 2008.

== Routine Schedule of Immunization ==
Every Wednesday is designated as immunization day and is adopted in all parts of the country. Immunization is done monthly in barangay health stations, quarterly in remote areas of the country.

== Routine Immunization Schedule for Infants ==
The standard routine immunization schedule for infants in the Philippines is adopted to provide maximum immunity against the seven vaccine preventable diseases in the country before the child's first birthday. The fully immunized child must have completed BCG 1, DPT 1, DPT 2, DPT 3, OPV 1, OPV 2, OPV 3, HB 1, HB 2, HB 3 and measles vaccines before the child is 12 months of age.

Vaccine	Minimum Age at 1st Dose	Number of Doses	Dose	Minimum Interval Between Doses	Route	Site	Reason
Bacillus Calmette-Guérin	Birth or anytime after birth	1 dose	0.05 mL	none	Intradermal	Right deltoid region of the arm	BCG given at earliest possible age protects the possibility of TB meningitis and other TB infections in which infants are prone
Diphtheria-Pertussis-Tetanus Vaccine	6 weeks old	3 doses	0.5 mL	6 weeks(DPT 1), 10 weeks (DPT 2), 14 weeks (DPT 3)	Intramuscular	Upper outer portion of the thigh, Vastus Lateralis (L-R-L)	An early start with DPT reduces the chance of severe pertussis.
Oral Polio Vaccine	6 weeks old	3 doses	2-3 drops	4 weeks	Oral	Mouth	The extent of protection against polio is increased the earlier the OPV is given. Keeps the Philippines polio-free.
Hepatitis B Vaccine	At birth	3 doses	0.5 mL	4 weeks interval	Intramuscular	Upper outer portion of the thigh, Vastus Lateralis (R-L-R)	An early start of Hepatitis B vaccine reduces the chance of being infected and becoming a carrier. Prevents liver cirrhosis and liver cancer which are more likely to develop if infected with Hepatitis B early in life. About 9,000 died of complications of Hepatitis B. 10% of Filipinos have Hepatitis B infection
Measles Vaccine (not MMR)	9 months old	1 dose	0.5 mL	none	Subcutaneous	Upper outer portion of the arms, Right deltoid	At least 85% of measles can be prevented by immunization at this age.

== General Principles in Infants/Children Immunization ==
- Because measles kills, every infant needs to be vaccinated against measles at the age of 9 months or as soon as possible after 9 months as part of the routine infant vaccination schedule. It is safe to vaccinate a sick child who is suffering from a minor illness (cough, cold, diarrhea, fever or malnutrition) or who has already been vaccinated against measles.
- If the vaccination schedule is interrupted, it is not necessary to restart. Instead, the schedule should be resumed using minimal intervals between doses to catch up as quickly as possible.
- Vaccine combinations (few exceptions), antibiotics, low-dose steroids (less than 20 mg per day), minor infections with low fever (below 38.5º Celsius), diarrhea, malnutrition, kidney or liver disease, heart or lung disease, non-progressive encephalopathy, well controlled epilepsy or advanced age, are not contraindications to vaccination. Contrary to what the majority of doctors may think, vaccines against hepatitis B and tetanus can be applied in any period of the pregnancy.
- There are very few true contraindication and precaution conditions. Only two of these conditions are generally considered to be permanent: severe (anaphylactic) allergic reaction to a vaccine component or following a prior dose of a vaccine, and encephalopathy not due to another identifiable cause occurring within 7 days of pertussis vaccination.
- Only the diluent supplied by the manufacturer should be used to reconstitute a freeze-dried vaccine. A sterile needle and sterile syringe must be used for each vial for adding the diluent to the powder in a single vial or ampoule of freeze-dried vaccine.
- The only way to be completely safe from exposure to blood-borne diseases from injections, particularly hepatitis B virus (HBV), hepatitis C virus (HCV), and human immunodeficiency virus (HIV) is to use one sterile needle, one sterile syringe for each child.

== Tetanus Toxoid Immunization Schedule for Women ==
When given to women of childbearing age, vaccines that contain tetanus toxoid (TT or Td) not only protect women against tetanus, but also prevent neonatal tetanus in their newborn infants.

Vaccine	Minimum Age/Interval	Percent Protected	Duration of Protection
TT1	At 20th weeks AOG	0%	protection for the mother for the first delivery
TT2	At least 4 weeks later	80%	infants born to the mother will be protected from neonatal tetanus; gives 3 years protection for the mother
TT3	At least 6 months later	95%	infants born to the mother will be protected from neonatal tetanus; gives 5 years protection for the mother
TT4	At least 1 year later	99%	infants born to the mother will be protected from neonatal tetanus; gives 10 years protection for the mother
TT5	At least 1 year later	99%	gives lifetime protection for the mother; all infants born to that mother will be protected

In June 2000, the 57 countries that have not yet achieved elimination of neonatal tetanus were ranked and the Philippines was listed together with 22 other countries in Class A, a classification for countries close to maternal and neonatal tetanus elimination.

== Care for the Vaccines ==
To ensure the optimal potency of vaccines, a careful attention is needed in handling practices at the country level. These include storage and transport of vaccines from the primary vaccine store down to the end-user at the health facility, and further down at the outreach sites. Inappropriate storage, handling and transport of vaccines won't protect patients and may lead to needless vaccine wastage.

A "first expiry and first out" (FEFO) vaccine system is practiced to assure that all vaccines are utilized before its expiry date. Proper arrangement of vaccines and/or labeling of expiry dates are done to identify those close to expiring. Vaccine temperature is monitored twice a day (early in the morning and in the afternoon) in all health facilities and plotted to monitor break in the cold chain. Each level of health facilities has cold chain equipment for use in the storage vaccines which included cold room, freezer, refrigerator, transport box, vaccine carriers, thermometers, cold chain monitors, ice packs, temperature monitoring chart and safety collector boxes.
