= Vaccinogen =

American biotechnology company

Vaccinogen Inc.
- Type: Public
- Traded as: OTCQB: VGEN
- Industry: Biotechnology
- Founded: 2007; 19 years ago
- Founder: Michael Hanna
- Headquarters: Baltimore
- Key people: Andrew Tussing (chairman and CEO)
- Products: OncoVAX
- Website: www.vaccinogeninc.com

Vaccinogen Inc. is a US biotechnology company based in Baltimore. It is currently developing a potential cancer immunotherapy called OncoVAX, where a patient's own tumor cells are used as the vaccine, adjuvanted by BCG. This product was evaluated in Phase III in colon cancer in the 1990s and another Phase III study, called ACTIVE, is currently recruiting stage II colon cancer patients. Vaccinogen calls its approach 'Active Specific Immunotherapy' or ASI.

== Background ==
Vaccinogen originated in work done by the company's founder, Dr Michael Hanna, in the late 1970s and early 1980s when he was Director of the National Cancer Institute's Frederick Cancer Research Center in Frederick, Maryland. Hanna founded a company to develop what became OncoVAX and this was acquired by a company from Seattle called Intracel, but that company filed for bankruptcy in 2001. Vaccinogen was formed in 2007 to pick up the intellectual property and other assets from Intracel. Dr Ben Carson was chairman of the company from August 2014 until the announcement of his US presidential bid in May 2015. Carson had previously served on Vaccinogen's Medical Advisory Board.

== OncoVAX ==
OncoVAX is an autologous cancer vaccine, that is, manufactured using the patient's own tumour cells. The product involves the surgical excision of the tumour and its sterilization and gamma-irradiation in order to render the tumour cells non-dividing. The patient is then administered two injections of these tumor cells mixed with the TICE strain of BCG via intradermal injection. After this, the patient receives two more injections of tumour cells but without the BCG. The first three immunizations are delivered weekly approximately a month after surgical resection of the tumor, and the fourth is given six months later. At the present time the product is intended for stage II colon cancer, where tumors have penetrated into the muscles around the colon, but have not visibly spread to lymph nodes of more distant sites.

== Development of OncoVAX ==
Hanna et al. performed three multi-institutional, prospectively randomized, controlled clinical trials of post-resection adjuvant ASI over the two decades to 2001. A meta-analysis of these studies published in the journal Vaccine found 'significant clinical benefits in patients with stage II colon cancer'. Hanna et al. described the 'trials and tribulations' involved in developing OncoVAX in a 2006 paper in the journal Human Vaccines.

* Pilot trial in colon and rectal cancer. Michael Hanna first took his ASI approach into the clinic in a pilot trial at Johns Hopkins Hospital that commenced in 1981. The lead investigator was Dr Herbert C. Hoover Jr., a 'distant nephew' of the 31st US President. The study, which evaluated 80 colon and rectal cancer patients, finally read out data in March 1993 in the Journal of Clinical Oncology. The study found a significant improvement in survival (p=0.02) and disease-free survival (p=0.039) in all eligible colon cancer patients but no benefits in rectal cancer patients.

* Phase III study in stage II and III colon cancer with first generation OncoVAX. This study in 412 patients, which compared ASI+resection vs resection alone, used a treatment regimen of only three weekly intradermal vaccine injections of 10^{7} irradiated autologous tumor cells where the first two injections also contained 10^{7} BCG organisms. After a 7.6-year median follow-up period there were no statistically significant differences in clinical outcomes between the treatment arms however there was a trend towards disease-free survival and overall survival for the ASI patients that had all three doses.

* Phase III trial in colon cancer with second generation OncoVAX. This 254-patient study, which has allowed Vaccinogen to make efficacy claims for its current version of OncoVAX and is called the '8701' study by the company, had its results published in The Lancet in January 1999. In this study the investigators used 10^{7} BCG organisms for the first two doses and added the booster vaccination at six months with 10^{7} irradiated autologous tumour cells. Over a median follow-up period of 5.3 years there was a 44% risk reduction for recurrence for patients that received OncoVAX (p=0.023), but only patients who had stage II disease benefited. For these patients the risk of recurrence was cut by 61%. The cost of the product was subsequently studied by medical technology assessment specialists at the Erasmus University Medical Center in Rotterdam who reported 'impressive health economics benefits' in a paper in Vaccine. In 2012 the investigators revisited the data to see if there was different outcomes for patients with microsatellite unstable versus stable colon cancer. In the process they tracked event-free survival for the study population out to 15 years, finding a hazard ratio for the treatment group of 0.62 (p=0.033).

== OncoVAX manufacturing ==
OncoVAX employs a 'centralised' manufacturing process where the patient's tumour sample is shipped to a company-owned cGMP manufacturing facility in the Dutch town of Emmen for processing and then shipped back to the hospital for administration to the patient. In the 8701 study manufacturing was not carried out under cGMP conditions. Subsequent to 8701 a small 15-patient study was carried out with manufacturing taking place under cGMP (ClinicalTrials.gov identifier NCT00016133). This study found that the immunogenicity of OncoVAX was unaffected by the manufacturing process.

== Planned clinical study of OncoVAX ==
Vaccinogen is currently enrolling patients in a confirmatory Phase III clinical study for OncoVAX called ACTIVE that will enroll 550 patients with stage II colon cancer, randomising 1:1 to receive surgery alone or surgery plus OncoVAX (ClinicalTrials.gov identifier NCT02448173). The Primary Endpoint in this study is the Disease-Free Interval.

Vaccinogen plans to conduct a pilot program in parallel with ACTIVE to evaluate OncoVAX in combination with an adjuvant chemotherapy treatment for stage III colon cancer patients.

== Human monoclonal antibodies program ==
In September 2015 Vaccinogen announced an exclusive two-year option with Dublin City University over a high-throughput, multiplex, analysis platform developed in the laboratory of Dr. Paul Leonard called DiCAST (Direct Clone Analysis and Selection Technology). Vaccinogen intends to use DiCAST to screen patient-derived biological samples acquired after those patients have gained anti-cancer immunity in the search for new anti-cancer antibodies.

== Vaccinogen stock ==
Vaccinogen stock is traded OTC in the US. It upgraded its marketplace tier to OTCQB in October 2013. The stock code is VGEN. The SEC suspended trading of this stock in September 2017. According to the letter of suspension, 'VGEN is delinquent in its periodic filings with the commission, having not filed any periodic reports since it filed a Form 10-Q for the period ended September 30, 2015, which reported a net loss available to common shareholders of $24,743,490 for the prior nine months.'

== Main people ==
Vaccinogen's Chairman and CEO is Andrew Tussing, a former investment banker who co-founded Vaccinogen with Michael Hanna in 2007. Michael Hanna remains a director. Vaccinogen's COO is Dr Peter Morsing, formerly of AstraZeneca.

== Location ==
Vaccinogen is headquartered in Baltimore at 949 Fell Street near Fell's Point. The company moved there in February 2015 after previously having been located at Frederick, Maryland. The company also maintains laboratories in Dublin and its manufacturing facility at Emmen. The Emmen location of Vaccinogen B.V. was declared bankrupt in 2017.
