= Bill Coplin =

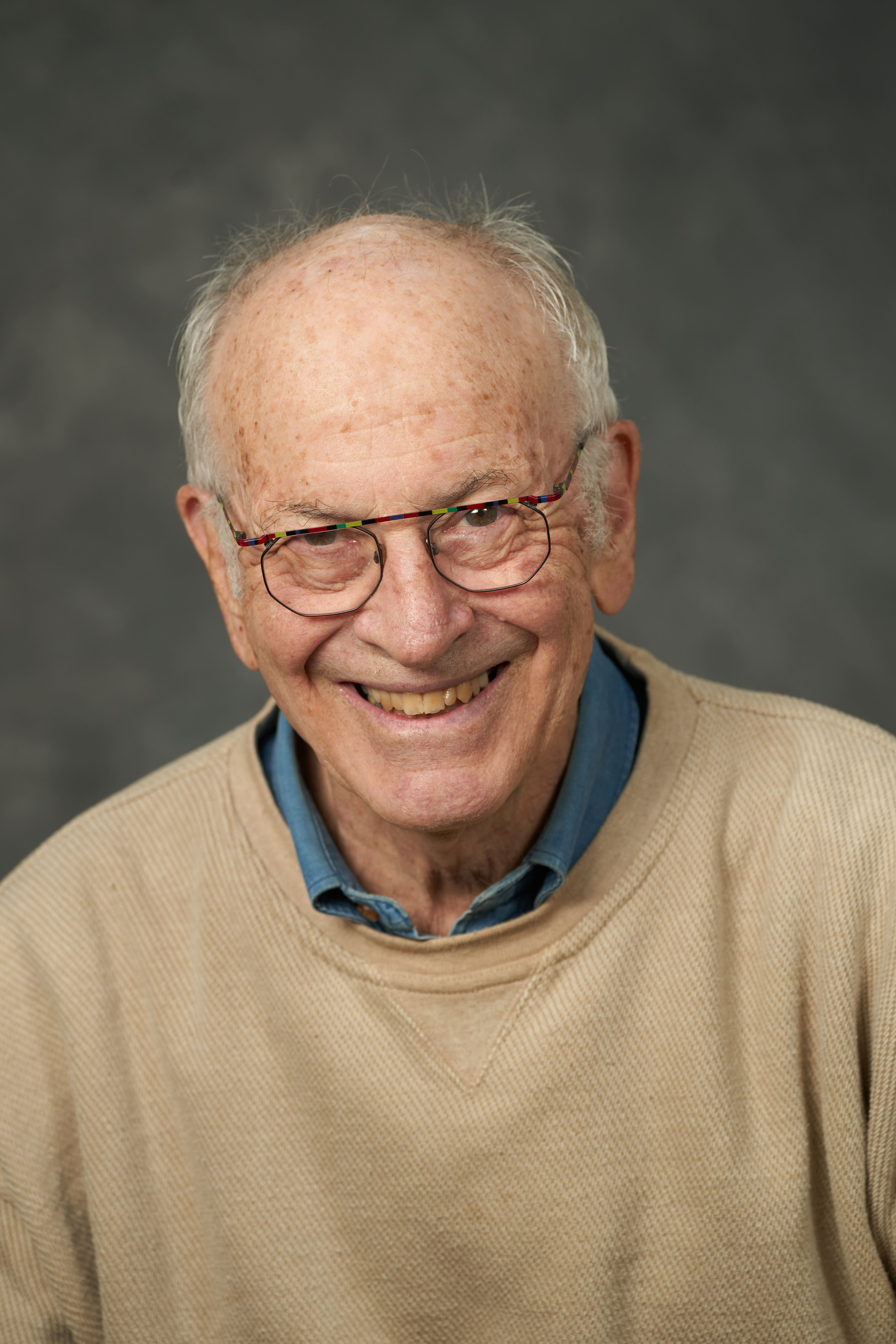

Bill Coplin is an American professor, advisor and author. He established the Policy Studies major at the Maxwell School of Citizenship and Public Affairs at Syracuse University, as well as a high school introductory course mirroring the Policy Studies major.

In 1995, Coplin was one of the first three to be appointed the J. and L. Douglas Meredith Professor for Teaching Excellence at the Maxwell School of Citizenship and Public Affairs at Syracuse University and College of Arts and Sciences at Syracuse University. Coplin has received grants from the Sloan Foundation, the Kellogg Foundation, and the National Science Foundation in support of his research and educational programs.

== Education ==
- Johns Hopkins University | BA | Social Sciences, 1960
- American University | MA | International Relations, 1962
- American University | PhD | International Relations, 1964
- University of Michigan | Postdoctoral | Quantitative Methods, 1968-1969

== Books ==
- The Path to Equity: Inclusion in the Kingdom of Liberal Arts, 2023
- The Happy Professor, 2019
- Public Policy: Skills In Action; A Pragmatic Approach, 2017
- Skills Win! A Playbook for Career Success, 2013
- 10 Things Employers Want You To Learn In College, 2012-revised
- 25 Ways To Make College Pay Off, 2007
- How You Can Help: An Easy Guide to Doing Good Deeds in Your Everyday Life, 2000
- The Handbook of Country and Political Risk Analysis, 1994
- Introduction to International Politics: A Theoretical Overview, 1980
- The Functions of International Law: An Introduction to the Role of International Law in the Contemporary World, 1966
