= IRevolution: Online Warriors of the Arab Spring =

iRevolution: Online Warriors of the Arab Spring is a documentary on Arab Spring in Bahrain (also known as the Bahraini uprising) prepared by journalist Amber Lyon and a team of producers for CNN. The documentary has aired only once on CNN US channel, to a positive reception. It has not been aired since, and it has never aired on CNN International. It has been claimed that Bahrain influenced CNNi to suppress it, and subsequently CNNi has been accused of biased coverage of the Bahraini revolution in general, and of suppressing (censoring) Lyon's critical documentary in particular. CNNi has denied those accusations.

== Documentary ==
The documentary has been prepared by a four-person team with investigative correspondent Amber Lyon and producers Scott Bronstein and Taryn Fixel, and producer-cameraman Leon Jobe for CNN. The group arrived in Bahrain in March 2011, to document the ongoing Arab Spring events there, the Bahraini uprising. A number of individuals the team was posed to interview have been already arrested, others, such as activist Nabeel Rajab, faced arrests and persecution after meeting with the journalists. The journalists themselves were subject to several hours of forced detention, and had some of their footage deleted. The remaining Bahraini footage was edited into a 13-minute segment in the documentary. The segment is highly critical of the Bahrain's authorities.

The 1-hour documentary cost CNN about $100,000, which is said to be significantly more than the average cost of such a film. As of 14 September 2012, the documentary has been aired only once, on 19 June 2011 at 8pm on the United States CNN channel.

The documentary won a 2012 Gold Medal from New York Festival's Best TV and Films. Amber Lyon and the documentary's producer Taryn Fixel, were also finalists in the 2011 Livingston Awards for Young Journalists.

== Controversy ==
The documentary has not been broadcast since its initial showing on US CNN; notably, it has not been shown on the CNN International, which has wide coverage in the Middle East. Despite various inquiries, CNNi has not provided any explanation as to why it has not aired the documentary. After Amber Lyon met with CNNi president Tony Maddox, she was eventually ordered not to discuss this issue any further. According to Lyon, who remained an outspoken on-air critic of Bahrain's government, the Bahrain authorities has complained numerous times to CNNi about the documentary in general and Lyon activities in particular, although officially Bahrain has refused to confirm or deny that it did so. It has been alleged that CNNi has been influenced by Bahraini-funded public relations campaigns.

In March 2012, CNN fired Lyon, officially as part of a reorganization of its documentaries division. After Lyon made further comments about the documentary on her Twitter account, her agent has been contacted by CNN representatives who threatened to cut her severance payments and insurance benefits if she would continue discussing the documentary. CNN has since refused to confirm or deny that it threatened Lyon in that way.

CNNi has been accused of biased coverage of the Bahraini revolution in general, and of suppressing (censoring) Lyon's critical documentary in particular. CNNi has denied those claims. CNNi denial has been criticized as misleading by journalists Glenn Greenwald and Cory Doctorow, who were in the forefront of bringing this matter to the public's attention through their coverage of the issue in September 2012.
