= Caplin Bay =

Bay in Newfoundland and Labrador, Canada

Coordinates: 52.616°N 55.764°W

Caplin Bay is a natural bay on the coast of Labrador in the province of Newfoundland and Labrador, Canada.
