= VDS =

VDS may refer to:

== Places ==
- Vadsø Airport (IATA airport code VDS), Norway
- Vidyasagar railway station (train station code VDS), Jamtara, Jharkhand, India
- Vanderbilt Divinity School, Nashville, Tennessee, United States

== Computing ==
- Virtual dedicated server, a virtual machine set up as a server
- Visual DialogScript, a programming language
- Virtual directory server
- Virtual DMA Services, an API

== Other uses ==
- Variable depth sonar, an array of towed sonars
- Vehicle Dependability Study, a benchmark by J. D. Power
- Village design statement, in English rural planning
- Village Drama Society, a theatrical society founded in England in 1919
- Vaccino Diffondente Salvioli, a tuberculosis vaccine
- Vijay Deverakonda (born 1989), Indian actor
- Verein Deutsche Sprache, the German Language Association
- Marc VDS Racing Team
- V. D. Satheesan (born 1964), an Indian politician

== See also ==
- VD (disambiguation)
