= William Stark =

William Stark may refer to:

- William Stark (loyalist) (1724–1776), older brother of Gen. John Stark, the hero of the Battle of Bennington
- William Stark (architect) (1770–1813), Scottish architect and town planner
- William Ledyard Stark (1853–1922), Nebraska Populist politician
- William Henry Stark (1851–1936), industrial leader whose contributions helped the city of Orange, Texas develop financially
- William Stark (physician) (1742–1770), English physician and medical pioneer who investigated scurvy by experimenting on himself with fatal consequences
- Billy Stark (born 1956), Scottish footballer

== See also ==
- Willie Stark, opera
- William E. Starke (1814–1862), a general in the American Civil War
- William Starke Rosecrans, a general in the American Civil War
