= Journal of Public Health =

- Discipline: Public health
- Language: English
- Edited by: Keith Neal, Premila Webster

Publication details
- History: 1892-present
- Publisher: Oxford University Press
- Frequency: Quarterly
- Impact factor: 5.058 (2021)

Standard abbreviations
- ISO 4: J. Public Health (Oxf.)

Indexing
- ISSN: 1741-3842 (print); 1741-3850 (web)
- LCCN: 2004252324
- OCLC no.: 612530974

Links
- Journal homepage; Online access; Online archive

The Journal of Public Health is a quarterly peer-reviewed public health journal. It was originally established in 1892 as the Journal of State Medicine by the Royal Institute of Public Health and has undergone several renames during its history. It acquired its current name in 2004 and is currently published by Oxford University Press on behalf of the Faculty of Public Health. The editors-in-chief are Keith Neal and Premila Webster.

== History ==
- Journal of State Medicine (1892–1905)
- Journal of Preventive Medicine (1905–1906)
- Journal of the Royal Institute of Public Health (1907–1911)
- Journal of State Medicine (1912–1937)
- Journal of the Royal Institute of Public Health and Hygiene (1937–1963) (which also continues Journal of the Institute of Hygiene, London)
- Royal Institute of Public Health and Hygiene Journal (1964–1968)
- Community Health (1969–1978)
- Community Medicine (1979–1989)
- Journal of Public Health Medicine (1990–2003)
- Journal of Public Health (2004–present)

== Abstracting and indexing ==
The journal is abstracted and indexed in:

- Abstracts on Hygiene and Communicable Diseases
- CAB Abstracts
- CINAHL
- Current Contents/Clinical Medicine
- Excerpta Medica Abstract Journals
- PubMed
- Science Citation Index
- Tropical Diseases Bulletin

According to the Journal Citation Reports, the journal has a 2021 impact factor of 5.058.
