= Nora Wattie =

Scottish social medicine pioneer (1900–1994)

Nora Wattie (20 May 1900–14 July 1994) OBE MBChB (Aberdeen), DPH (Cambridge) was a pioneer of social medicine, setting up Glasgow’s internationally renowned ante-natal care service (both before and after the creation of the National Health Service).

Throughout her career, Wattie was modernising and innovating; initially treating the suffering of women and their babies who were infected with sexually transmitted diseases by husbands returning home after the Second World War, later eliminating diphtheria through a city-wide chain of clinics. For 30 years, Wattie worked on improving women's and children's physical and mental health in the slums of Glasgow, influencing the medical profession and advising government. After her retirement, Wattie offered health education to future parents at schools and colleges. In 1964, Wattie was appointed as an officer of the Order of the British Empire for services to public health, and declared Scotswoman of the Year by the Glasgow Evening Times.

== Early life and education ==
Born Nora Isabel Wattie on 30 May 1899 at 12 Inverleith Gardens, Edinburgh, she was one of the four daughters of Catherine Carne Wattie née Diack and James Macpherson Wattie (1862–1943), an H.M. Inspector of Schools, member of the Edinburgh Mathematical Society and previously a lecturer in English.

Wattie herself attended Aberdeen Girls High School, and in 1916 attained her school leaving certificates. She went on to study medicine at Aberdeen University, graduating with a Bachelor of Medicine, Bachelor of Surgery on 14 July 1921. In 1922 she was appointed non-resident house physician by Edinburgh Royal Infirmary, and Wattie went on to qualify in Public Health at Cambridge University in 1923.

Wattie and her sisters (Mary, Katherine and Patricia) established the Wattie Prize in Arts and Social Sciences at the University of Aberdeen in honour of their father on his death in 1943:

... to commemorate the name of James Macpherson Wattie, their father, the prize is awarded annually to the best candidate in English Language in the English Honours examination, provided that his or her work shows distinction.

== Career ==
Wattie's first senior role was as Venereal Diseases Officer in Glasgow from 1929. Wattie's approach was to encourage contact tracing and volunteering for treatment, rather than the prevailing more judgemental view taken about those suffering from sexually transmitted diseases, and published her own research on improving sex education and maternity care. Wattie put her proposals out to non-medical forums as well; for example, addressing 700 delegates of the National Council of Women in Portsmouth in 1930 about the substantial Seamen's Welfare Agencies supported in Glasgow; the Council passed a resolution 'for improved medical and recreational facilities for the welfare of seamen'.

Wattie went on to develop her primary interest in improving the health of women and children in the poorest slums of Glasgow, and, in 1934, she was appointed Principal Medical Officer (Maternity and Child Welfare). The conditions of poverty and poor hygiene made it difficult to eradicate infections, but Wattie and her assistant, Margaret Barron (who later succeeded her), convinced the Glasgow City Corporation to invest in clinics and health education; thus improving maternal care and the take-up of immunisation, which together effectively eliminated diphtheria in the city within a few years.

Wattie supported Mary Barbour in setting up, in 1926, the Women's Welfare and Advisory Clinic, i.e. the first family planning clinic for married women, staffed by women (nurses and doctors), and also backed Barbour's campaigning for people affected by tuberculosis. Wattie spoke about social and public health steps in preventing such a deadly disease, e.g. in 1939 at the Conference of National Girls' Clubs; even back in 1913 Wattie led on tuberculosis risks at a public meeting in Motherwell, sponsored by the Scottish Council for Health Education.

In 1936, Wattie spoke to the Glasgow District Nursing Association on the danger of the common cold and that 'children brought up in overcrowded dwellings, and unsuitably fed and clothed, were especially liable to catarrhal infections'. In 1941, Wattie was advocating school feeding in a paper 'The Child Under War Conditions' saying the supply of a balanced meal to make up deficiencies in a child's home diet should continue:

"Was it too much to hope that within the near future such schemes would be universal and apply to all children?"

Wattie also spoke out in disagreement with complaints from rural families that dirty and uneducated evacuated children from Glasgow were from 'inefficient mothers' or due to the inadequate management of the evacuation programme, arguing instead for the eradication of city slums : "Today the special need is for active service to improve the conditions of the children living in the 'black spots'."

Wattie had introduced maternity home helps (known as the Green Ladies, from the colour of their uniform) who supported new mothers and also established temporary accommodation in children's homes if mothers required hospitalisation (e.g. for the birth of subsequent children), all of which was intended to improve the 'psychology of the pre-school child and of the conditions favourable to health mental growth' as described in a speech Wattie made to the Public Health Section of the Royal Philosophical Society of Glasgow. In 1949, she ascribed the 'great success' of the district nurses to the 'fine training' provided by the Queen's Institute of District Nursing.

Wattie was recruited for a 'Brains Trust' which met in Glasgow in 1942, The question master was Tom Honeyman, and other panellists included Guy McCrone and Paul Vincent Carroll.

Wattie was co-opted as being 'eminently qualified' to participate in the British Government’s Scientific Advisory Committee on Infant Mortality, reporting to the House of Commons in February 1944 on how to reduce infant deaths and on plans for health improvement. In the following year, she was one of fifteen members of a committee to look into the provision of children deprived of a normal home life. The Committee had been set up by the Secretary of State for Scotland, Tom Johnston, and also included social pioneer May Baird and author Naomi Mitchison.

In the Scottish Council for Health Education summer school at St. Andrews' University in 1945, Wattie was advocating that teachers should be trained in hygiene and that 'every school should have at least hot & cold water and indoor lavatories' and noting that

"If every child could be trained to wash its hands after using the toilet and before meals it would revolutionise the health of the country."

Wattie also spoke out on behalf of providing adequate facilities in schools for girls in puberty, researching in 1949 the lack of availability of period products (sanitary towels), changing facilities and safe disposal in 53 schools, for the Menstrual Hygiene Subcommittee of the Medical Women's Federation. It was not until 24 November 2020, that the Scottish Parliament (after four years of debates) unanimously passed The Period Products (Free Provision) (Scotland) Act making it a statutory duty on local authorities, and becoming the first country in the world to provide free facilities for menstruation. In 1956 the local press reported Wattie's Presidential Address to the Montrose conference of the Royal Sanitary Association of Scotland, summing up the need for collaboration in changing times:

"The whole history of the child welfare movement has shown the enormous benefits we have reaped from the partnership of health and education working towards the creation of happy, healthy childhood and happy family life."

In 1956-59, Wattie served on the Maternity Services in Scotland Committee advising on the NHS requirements and improving administration for ante-natal services and links to general practices. In 1961-2, Wattie was elected President of the Society of Medical Officers of Health, as the second woman to hold the post, and first Scottish woman elected.

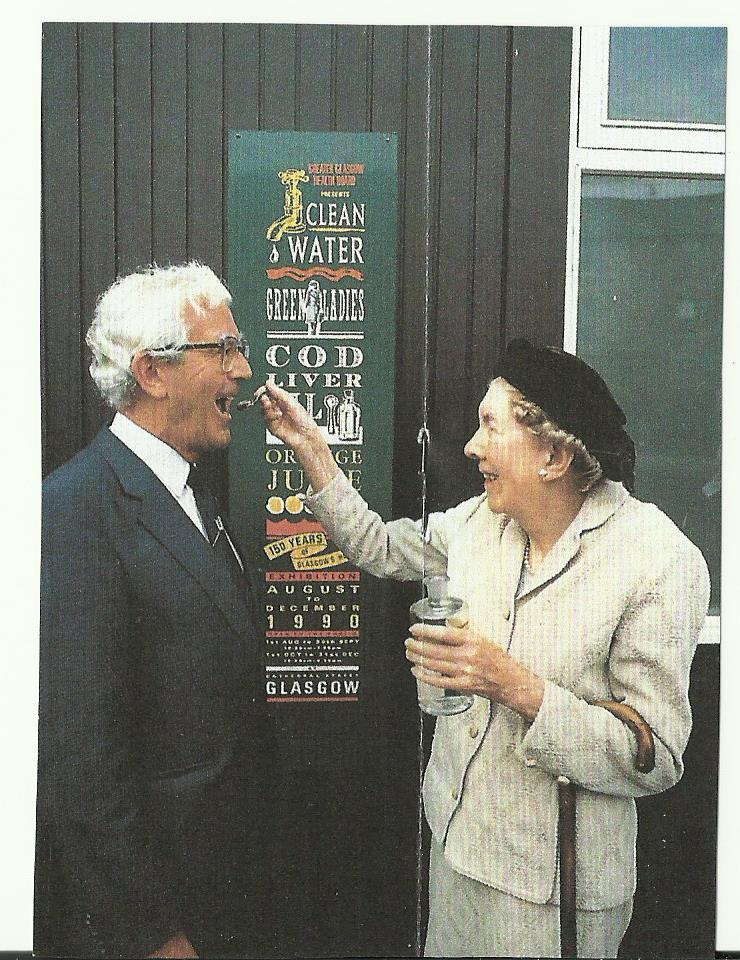
Nora Wattie offers chair of health board some cod liver oil 1990

In her retirement, Wattie developed heath education for schools and colleges for the 'mothers and fathers of the future'. In 1990, at Greater Glasgow Health Board's exhibition to mark the City of Culture, (entitled Cod Liver Oil and Orange Juice and featuring 'graphic displays of medical advances'), its guest of honour, Nora Wattie, offered a spoonful of cod liver oil to the Board’s chair Sir Thomas Thomson.

Wattie died on 14 July 1994.
