= Royal Institute of Public Health =

Royal Institute of Public Health merged in 2008 with the Royal Society for Health to form Royal Society for Public Health (RSPH).

== History ==
The institute was the amalgamation of a few societies. The Metropolitan Association of Medical Officers of Health was an English society of metropolitan Medical Officer for Health established on 3 April 1856. In 1869 "Metropolitan" was dropped from the title, and in 1873 it became the Society of Medical Officers of Health, and in 1989 it became the Society of Public Health.

== Timeline ==
	Timeline of the Royal Institute of Public Health and Hygiene
Year	event
1886	Formation of the Society of Medical Men Qualified in Sanitary Science, name quickly changed to The Public Health Medical Society
1891	International Congress on Hygiene in London
1892	Society Incorporated as British Institute of Public Health
1895	Harben Gold Medal and lectureship inaugurated
1897	Queen Victoria becomes patron and issues letters patent. Name changed to Royal Institute of Public Health
1901	King Edward VII becomes patron
1903	Institute of Hygiene Limited registered as a company "for the advancement of knowledge of hygiene (especially personal and domestic) and for establishing a museum of hygiene to exhibit articles of merit"
1904	Report of RIPH Committee on Bacterial Examination of Water
1905	RIPH laboratories open for chemical, bacterial, and pathological specimens
1907	Midlands Counties Branch becomes the first IH provincial branch
1908	Further provincial IH branches approved
1909	IH makes public appeal to help finance rapid development
1910	King George V becomes RIPH patron
1912	RIPH launch appeal for £3000 for building work. W. H. Lever donates £600 for the foundation of a museum
1913	RIPH Lever Museum inaugurated
1914	Queen visits RIPH
1915	IH involved in the design of respirators for use of public in the event of a gas attack
1916	Secretary of RIPH and four doctors are killed in action
1917	IH offer their services to new Ministry of Food (offer rejected)
1918	January–February IH Food Saving exhibition
1920	IH replaces monthly Periodical Letter to Members with Health Notes
1923	IH Membership Badge instituted
1924	IH Journal replaces Health Notes
1925	IH new headquarters at 28 Portland Place opened by Princess Mary on 5 June
1926	Leicester Personal Health Association becomes affiliated with IH
1927	Department of State Medicine of RIPH set up to train London medical students in forensic medicine and toxicology
1928	IH becomes an associate member of the Central Council for Health Education
1929	IH granted Royal Charter of Incorporation
1930	RIPH public lectures on birth control
1931	RIPH public lectures on Health of the Citizen
1932	RIPH begin negotiations with Royal Sanitary Institute, and later the Institute of Hygiene and the British Social Hygiene Council, for amalgamation
1933	Opening of 23 Queen Square as new RIPH headquarters
1934	RIPH negotiations with Royal Sanitary Institute terminated
1935	Negotiations between RIPH and IH reopened. Draft agreement for amalgamation reached
1937	IH supplemental charter granted by Privy Council
1938	Journals combined
1940	Exhibition and lectures on Food and Fitness
1947	First Bengue Memorial Award lecture
1948	RIPHH publishes History of State medicine in England by Sir A. Macnalty
1949	Provincial health lectures start at Leicester
1951	Queen Elizabeth II becomes patron
1954	Abortive discussions on amalgamation with Royal Sanitary Institute
1958	Courses on Food Hygiene and the Handling of Food introduced
1962	Closure of Hygiene Museum
1977	Closure of laboratories

== Presidents ==
Past presidents include:

- John Simon, first president
- Lawson Soulsby, Baron Soulsby of Swaffham Prior
- Nora Wattie

== Publications ==
- Public Health (journal), now owned by Royal Society for Public Health.

== Previous publications ==
- Journal of State Medicine
- Health & Hygiene
