= Salvioli's diffusing vaccine =

Tuberculosis vaccine

Salvioli's diffusing vaccine (known by its Italian initials VDS, for vaccino diffondente Salvioli) was an Italian vaccine against tuberculosis used from 1948 until 1976, formulated by professor Gaetano Salvioli (1894–1982) of the University of Bologna. The VDS was for some decades the Italian competitor of the French BCG vaccine against tuberculosis.

== History ==
The VDS, definitively standardized between 1948 and 1953 by Professor Gaetano Salvioli, originated first in the studies and vaccine products of Professor Edoardo Maragliano (1849–1940) and Professor Giovanni Petragnani (1893–1969), physiologist and rector of the University of Siena. If Maragliano could boast, in 1903, at the World Congress of Medicine in Madrid that he was the first to develop an anti-tuberculosis serum with killed bacilli, Petragnani further developed his previous experiences and from 1927 to 1935 defined the Italian anti-tuberculosis vaccine under the name AIP (Anatubercolina Integrale Petragnani). When Petragnani interrupted his studies and applications (because he was appointed in 1935 by Benito Mussolini, as Director General of Public Health), Professor Gaetano Salvioli continued his studies and applications. From 1935 to 1948 Salvioli proceeded to the formulation of a vaccine called in that period VPS (vaccine Petragnani Salvioli).

== Composition ==
The VDS consisted of Mycobacterium tuberculosis (or Koch's bacilli), killed by heat and added to ferment hyaluronidase.

One dose for newborns consisted of "a single intradermal injection, carried out at about half of the palmar face of the forearm, is used to introduce into the newborn baby a dose N of lyophilized anti-tuberculosis vaccine consisting of human Koch [bK] bacilli and cattle killed rapidly by heat. This dose [was] 0.68 mgr of human bK plus 0.07 mgr of bovine bK, to which [were] added 6 V units. of Jalovis [hyaluronidase] all in 0.2 cc of solvent [...]}".

Koch's bacilli were cultivated for 30–45 days in "Petragnani's ground". The bacterial patinas, or veils of the cultivated bacteria, were broken up and had to be pulverized, first with a spatula and then with mechanical stirrers to obtain a finer dispersion of the bacilli. The killing of the bacterial suspensions was carried out with the exposure of the duration of few minutes to the heat under pressure at a temperature of 110°, but avoiding boiling.

== The ground Petragnani ==
The composition and layout of the land Petragnani was as follows. One took 150 cubic centimeters of milk to which were added 1 gram of peptone, 6 grams of potato starch and a peeled potato washed and in pieces. It was brought in bain-marie boiling and shaken everything until the ground had assumed a consistency of sticky type. It was left, always in a bain-marie for about another 30 minutes. It was cooled to about 40 degrees and added 4 eggs and a whole yolk. We filtered through sterile gauze in a graduated cylinder and we added to the filtrate 3% of glycerine and 4% of an aqueous solution to 2% of malachite. It was then distributed in large tubes and it was coagulated at 80-85° for 30 minutes by means of a device designed by Petragnani himself, which provided for a thermoregulator and special large inclined tubes so that the soil solidified like a flute beak.

== Areas of application ==
In the second post-war period, the spread of TB in Italy was still very high, but antituberculous vaccination was not mandatory. The bibliography of the time indicates that from 1948 to 1970 the VDS was applied very widely in different parts of Italy. In 1970 it was declared that about 100,000 vaccinations had been performed with positive results. It was widely applied in the municipality and province of Bologna, in particular at the pediatric clinic of the University of Bologna, directed by Professor Gaetano Salvioli himself. Over the years there were several Italian centers (pediatric clinics, provincial consortia antitubercolari, headquarters of ONMI (Opera Nazionale Maternità Infanzia) that applied the "Italian-style vaccine" as they used to say at the time to distinguish it from the "French-style vaccine", the competitor BCG. The VDS was also applied abroad: in Osaka in Japan, Czechoslovakia, Poland, Kolwezi (now in the Democratic Republic of Congo). In the area of Bologna (municipality and province) up to 80% of newborns were vaccinated. In the province of Venice, the Consortium Antitubercolare Provincial vaccinated between 1953 and 1958 about 16 000 people, especially primary school children.

== The involuntary experiment of Dolo (Venice) ==
Between 1938 and the first months of 1943 Professor Sandro Taronna (1901–1972), director of the Consortium Antitubercolare in Venice had vaccinated 354 children in the orphanage Pio Ospedale della Pietà of Venice. Because of the bombing of the city, 132 children were transferred to the sanatorium building of Dolo in Venice, of which 54 were vaccinated with VPS. Unfortunately, tuberculosis also entered into the sanatorium, causing several victims. This involuntary situation was studied after the war for about 10 years as an exceptional case. After a year of forced cohabitation because of the war, of the 54 vaccinated, 49 survived. 5 died but was verified by autopsies that it happened due to other causes. Of the 78 unvaccinated, 48 survived but 12 died due to Tuberculosis. 18 others died from other causes.

== The two producers of the VDS ==
The Italian anti-tubercular vaccine VDS was initially produced by the company Alfa Farmaceutici of Bologna of Dr Marino Golinelli. Considering the excellent results and the spread that had the VDS, between 1956 and 1958 the ISM (Istituto Sieroterapico Milanese Serafino Belfanti) in Milan, then led by the Honorable Giovanni Battista Migliori, acquired the production rights from Alfa. The ISM of Milan was the largest public company of serums and vaccines in Italy. ISM was, from 1894 to 1994, a non-profit institution entirely owned by the Municipality of Milan, with a plant in via Darwin in Milan. In the two-year period 1956–1958 ISM produced six supplies. In the summer of 1958, however, he gave up the production of the vaccine because its 6th supply of 3000 pieces, turned out not to correspond to the protocol provided by Professor Gaetano Salvioli. This batch caused an anomalous vaccination that involved, with a plague at the point of inoculation, 2797 schoolchildren from the province of Venice and infants of Ferrara and Trieste. The plague took several months to heal.

From 1959, until the decision of the Ministry of Health to officially adopt the BCG in Italy (art.1 of the Ministerial Decree of 25 June 1976), the production of VDS returned to the companies of Dr. Marino Golinelli.

== See also ==
- History of tuberculosis
