= List of deaths due to tuberculosis =

The following is a list of notable people who have died due to tuberculosis.

- 641: Heraclius Constantine – Byzantine Emperor, aged 29.
- 1485: Anne Neville - Queen of England, aged 28.
- 1509: Henry VII of England – King of England, aged 52.
- 1537: Madeleine of Valois – Queen of Scotland, aged 16.
- 1553: Edward VI – King of England, aged 15.
- 1574: Charles IX of France – King of France, aged 23.
- 1643: Louis XIII – King of France, aged 41.
- 1744: Anders Celsius – Swedish astronomer, physicist and mathematician, aged 42.
- 1764: Madame de Pompadour – Chief mistress of King Louis XV, aged 42.
- 1795: Louis XVII – King of France, aged 10.
- 1821: John Keats – English poet, aged 25.
- 1827: Augustin-Jean Fresnel – French civil engineer and physicist, aged 39.
- 1827: George Canning – Prime Minister of the United Kingdom, aged 57.
- 1829: Niels Henrik Abel - Norwegian mathematician, aged 26.
- 1830: Simón Bolívar – Venezuelan political leader, aged 47 (reported).
- 1831: James Monroe – American Founding Father and 5th president of the United States, aged 73.
- 1849: Juliusz Słowacki – one of the leading poets of Polish Romanticism, aged 39.
- 1849: Anne Brontë – English novelist and poet, aged 29.
- 1849: Frédéric Chopin – Polish composer, aged 39 (possibly cystic fibrosis).
- 1850: Oliver Cowdery - American religious leader and prominent figure in the early Latter Day Saint movement, aged 43.
- 1852: Henry Clay – American lawyer and statesman, aged 75.
- 1858: Dred Scott – plaintiff in landmark American Supreme Court case.
- 1862: Henry David Thoreau – American naturalist and author, aged 44.
- 1866: Bernhard Riemann – German mathematician, aged 39.
- 1867: Takasugi Shinsaku — Japanese samurai, aged 27.
- 1868: Okita Sōji — Japanese samurai, aged 24-26.
- 1883: Jim Devlin — American baseball player, aged 34.
- 1887: John Henry "Doc" Holliday – American Gunslinger and Gambler, aged 36.
- 1890: Christopher Latham Sholes – American inventor, aged 71.
- 1896: Marcelo H. del Pilar – Filipino writer, lawyer and journalist, aged 45.
- 1897: Thérèse of Lisieux – French Catholic Carmelite nun and saint, aged 24.
- 1900: Stephen Crane – American author, aged 28.
- 1902–1903: Annie Jones – American sideshow performer, aged 37.
- 1903: St. Gemma Galgani, age 25
- 1904: Anton Chekhov – Russian playwright, aged 44.
- 1906: Paul Laurence Dunbar – American poet, aged 33.
- 1908: Marie Jungius – Dutch educator, writer, and activist, aged 44.
- 1911: Robert Tressell – Irish writer, aged 40.
- 1918: Gavrilo Princip – Bosnian Serb assassin of Archduke Franz Ferdinand, aged 23.
- 1923: Katherine Mansfield – New Zealand writer, aged 34.
- 1924: Franz Kafka – Bohemian Jewish novelist, aged 40.
- 1930: Christopher Morcom – aged 18, childhood friend of Alan Turing
- 1934: Lev Vygotsky – Russian psychologist, aged 37.
- 1934: Nestor Ivanovych Makhno – Ukrainian anarchist revolutionary, aged 45.
- 1937: Gim Yujeong - Korean novelist, aged 29.
- 1937: Yi Sang - Korean novelist and poet, aged 26.
- 1937: Na Woon-gyu - Korean actor, filmmaker. aged 34.
- 1939: Pedro Aguirre Cerda - Chilean politician and 22nd president of Chile, aged 62.
- 1942: Thomas C. Neibaur - American soldier and Medal of Honor recipient, aged 44.
- 1944: Manuel L. Quezon – Filipino politician and 2nd president of the Philippines, aged 65.
- 1950: George Orwell – English writer, aged 46.
- 1956: Johnny Claes – British-born Belgian race car driver, aged 39.
- 1961: Erwin Schrödinger – Austrian physicist, aged 73.
- 1962: Eleanor Roosevelt – First Lady of the United States, aged 78.
- 1967: Vivien Leigh – British actress, aged 53.
- 2020: Wang Jin – Chinese archaeologist, aged 93.
