= William Stark (physician) =

English physician and medical pioneer (1740 or 1741–1770)

- Born: 1740
- Died: 23 February 1770 (aged 29–30); London
- Scientific career
- Fields: physician

William Stark (1740 or 1741–1770) was an English physician and medical pioneer who investigated scurvy by experimenting on himself with fatal consequences. He devised 24 restrictive diets, such as bread and water with a little sugar for thirty-one days, but died after only eight months whilst living exclusively on honey puddings and Cheshire cheese. Although he was experimenting with diet restriction, autopsy findings suggest that he died from a phaeochromocytoma.

== Early life ==
William was born in Birmingham, the eldest son of Thomas Stark, a merchant of Manchester. (also sometimes described as of 'Scottish parents'). He studied philosophy at Glasgow University, where he graduated MA in 1758, and then proceeded to Edinburgh, where he became friends with William Cullen. He moved to London in 1765, and concentrated on the study of medicine, entering as a pupil at St George's Hospital. He studied anatomy under John Hunter (1728–1773), and undertook experiments on blood and other animal fluids. He studied medicine at the University of Leiden, obtaining his degree on 2 September 1766 (or 1769) He published his thesis Specimen medicum inaugurale septem historias et dissectiones dysentericorum exhibens in 1766.

== Self experimentation ==
Stark was a friend of Sir John Pringle, and Benjamin Franklin, and his experimenting was triggered by Ben Franklin's description of how, as a printer, he had survived for 2 weeks on a simple diet of bread and water.

Encouraged and advised by John Pringle, Stark began his study of scurvy in London, June 1769, with a series of dietary experiments on himself. He devised a series of 24 dietary experiments in an effort to prove that a "pleasant and varied diet was as healthful as simpler strict diets". He kept accurate measures of temperature and weather conditions, the weights of all food and water he consumed, and the weight of all daily excretions. Stark also recorded how he felt on a daily basis, he described himself as being a healthy, 6-foot-tall (1.8 m) young man.

His experiment started with a basic diet of bread and water with a little sugar for thirty-one days. He became 'dull and listless' so ate better until he recovered. He resumed experimenting by adding various foods, one at a time - olive oil, milk, roast goose, boiled beef, fat, figs, and veal. After two months, his gums were red and swollen, and they bled when pressure was applied, a symptom of scurvy.

By November 1769 he was living on nothing but pudding, albeit with black currants to celebrate Boxing Day. He had considered testing fresh fruits and vegetables but was still working through tests with honey puddings and Cheshire cheese when he died in February 1770.

== Death and legacy ==
After eight months of experimenting, he died on 23 February 1770, at the age of twenty-nine. Stark died after five days of severe headache, abdominal pain, tachycardia, fever, anxietas praecordium, marked restlessness, oliguria, a conspicuously florid facies, and persistent spitting of "sweet saliva" and, sometimes, blood. There was probably a hypovolaemia present. At the postmortem inspection, probably the main findings were pulmonary oedema and multiple extravasations of blood in the lungs. Also noted were an inflamed ileum and a flaccid heart. It is suggested that Stark died from a phaeochromocytoma1G-12 (were the enlarged "mesenteric glands" multiple, ectopic tumors?).

His legacy was not a breakthrough discovery but his detailed record keeping indicated the importance of vitamin C to later researchers. Had he heeded the recent discoveries of James Lind, he would have known to include citrus fruits in his experimental diet. Instead he followed Pringle's advice to abstain from salt. His friends attributed his death to "the impudent zeal with which he prosecuted his investigations".

James Carmichael Smyth published The works of the late William Stark … consisting of clinical and anatomical observations, with experiments dietetical and statical (1788), eighteen years after his death.
