= Gram stain =

Investigative procedure in microbiology

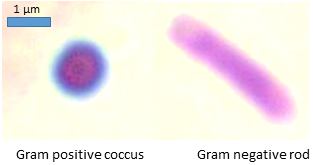
Micrograph of a gram-positive coccus and a gram-negative rod.

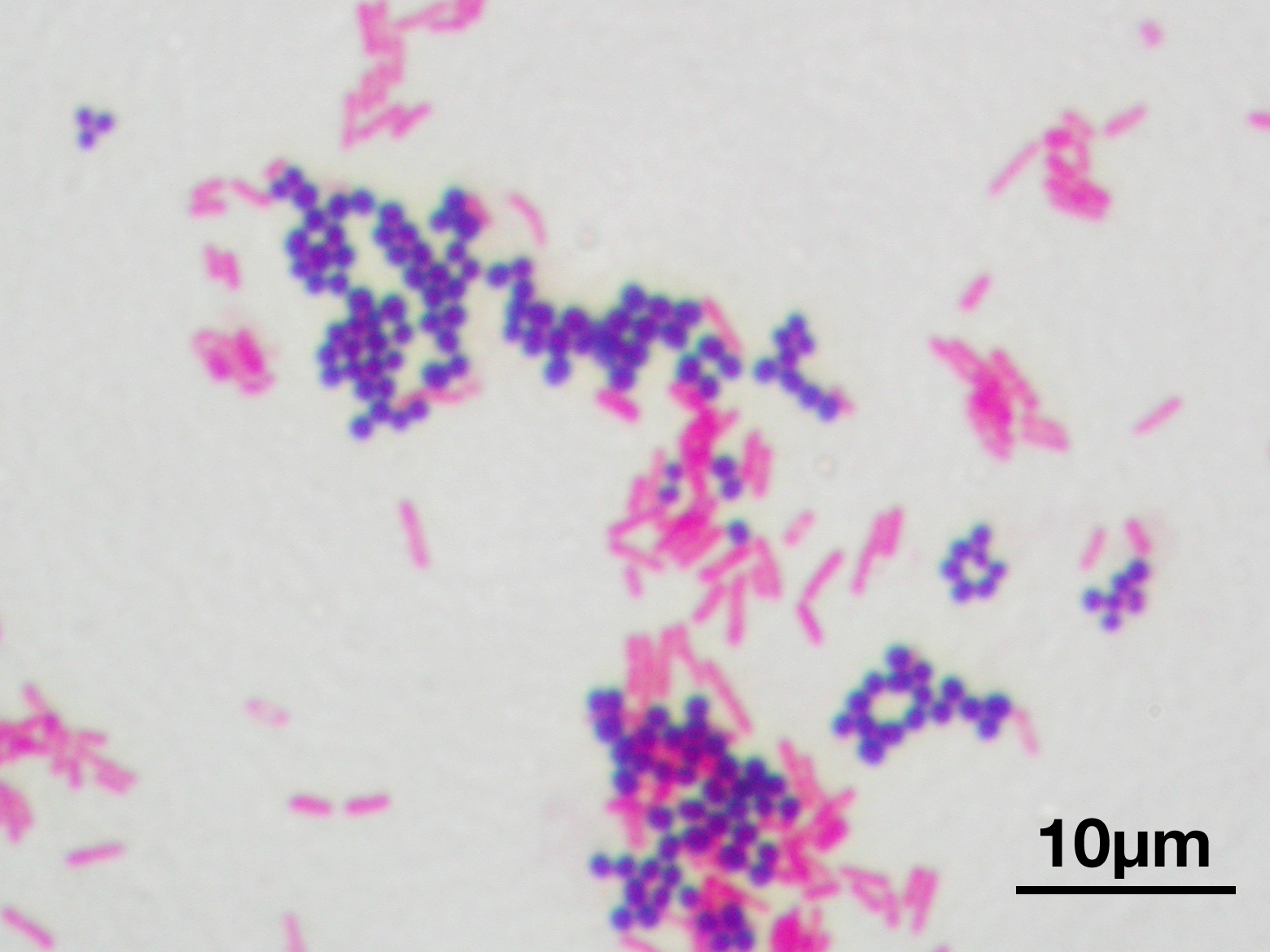
A Gram stain of mixed Staphylococcus aureus (S. aureus ATCC 25923, gram-positive cocci, in purple) and Escherichia coli (E. coli ATCC 11775, gram-negative bacilli, in red), the most common Gram stain reference bacteria

Gram stain (Gram staining or Gram's method) is a method of staining used to classify bacterial species into two large groups: gram-positive bacteria and gram-negative bacteria. It may also be used to diagnose a fungal infection. The name comes from the Danish bacteriologist Hans Christian Gram, who developed the technique in 1884.

Gram staining differentiates bacteria by the chemical and physical properties of their cell walls. Gram-positive cells have a thick layer of peptidoglycan in the cell wall that retains the primary stain, crystal violet. Gram-negative cells have a thinner peptidoglycan layer that allows the crystal violet to wash out on addition of ethanol. They are stained pink or red by the counterstain, commonly safranin or fuchsine. Lugol's iodine solution is always added after addition of crystal violet to form a stable complex with crystal violet that strengthens the bonds of the stain with the cell wall.

Gram staining is almost always the first step in the identification of a bacterial group. While Gram staining is a valuable diagnostic tool in both clinical and research settings, not all bacteria can be definitively classified by this technique. This gives rise to gram-variable and gram-indeterminate groups.

== History ==
The method is named after its inventor, the Danish scientist Hans Christian Gram (1853–1938), who developed the technique while working with Carl Friedländer in the morgue of the city hospital in Berlin in 1884. Gram devised his technique not for the purpose of distinguishing one type of bacterium from another but to make bacteria more visible in stained sections of lung tissue. Gram noticed that some bacterial cells possessed noticeable resistance to decolorization. Based on these observations, Gram developed the initial gram staining procedure, initially making use of Ehrlich's aniline-gentian violet, Lugol's iodine, absolute alcohol for decolorization, and Bismarck brown for counterstain. He published his method in 1884, and included in his short report the observation that the typhus bacillus did not retain the stain. Gram did not initially make the distinction between Gram-negative and Gram-positive bacteria using his procedure.

== Uses ==
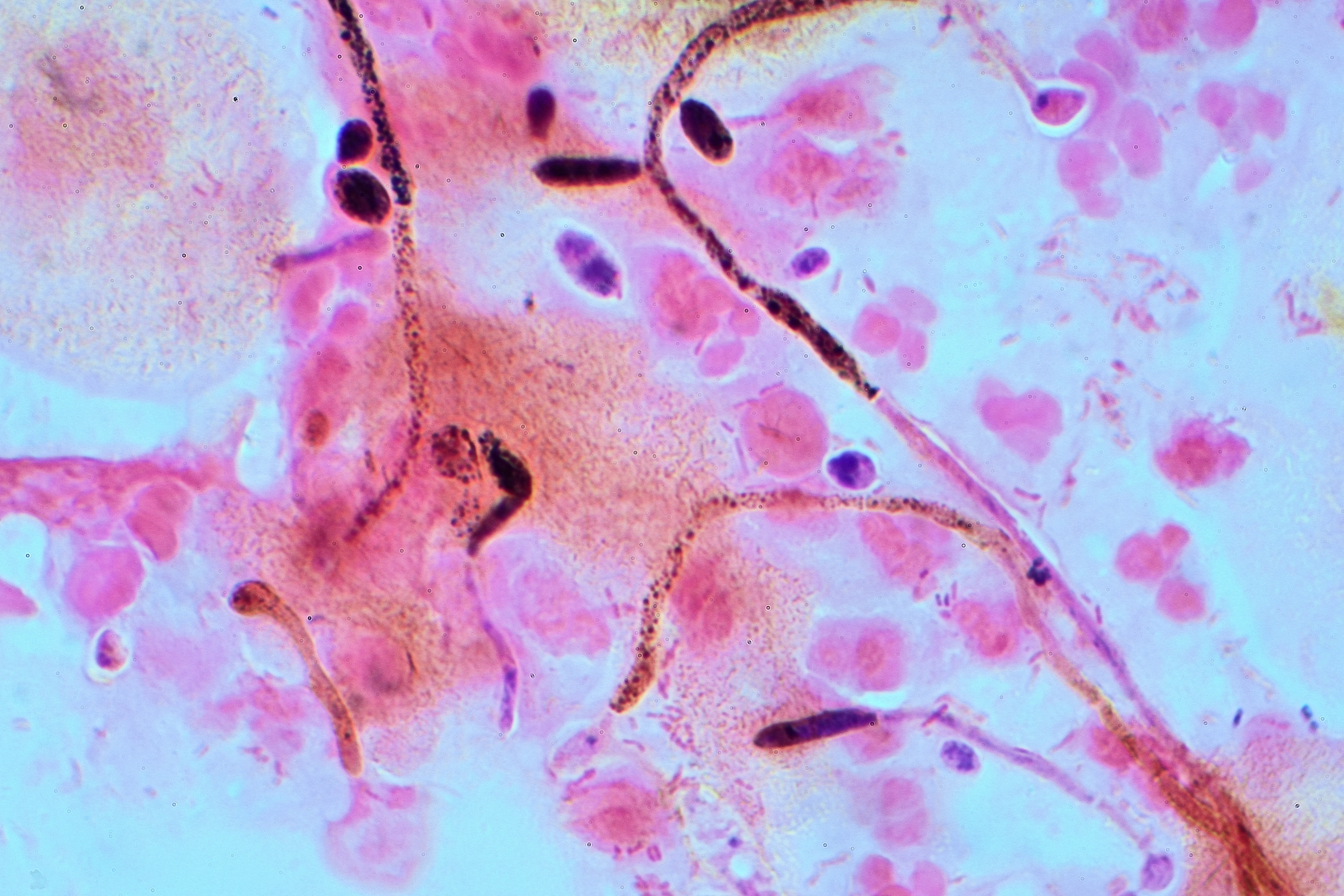
Gram stain of Candida albicans from a vaginal swab. The small oval chlamydospores are 2–4 μm in diameter.

Gram staining is a bacteriological laboratory technique used to differentiate bacterial species into two large groups (gram-positive and gram-negative) based on the physical properties of their cell walls. Gram staining can also be used to diagnose a fungal infection. Gram staining is not used to classify archaea, since these microorganisms yield widely varying responses that do not follow their phylogenetic groups.

Gram stains are performed on body fluid or biopsy when infection is suspected. Gram stains yield results much more quickly than culturing, and are especially important when infection would make an important difference in the patient's treatment and prognosis; examples are cerebrospinal fluid for meningitis and synovial fluid for septic arthritis.

== Staining mechanism ==
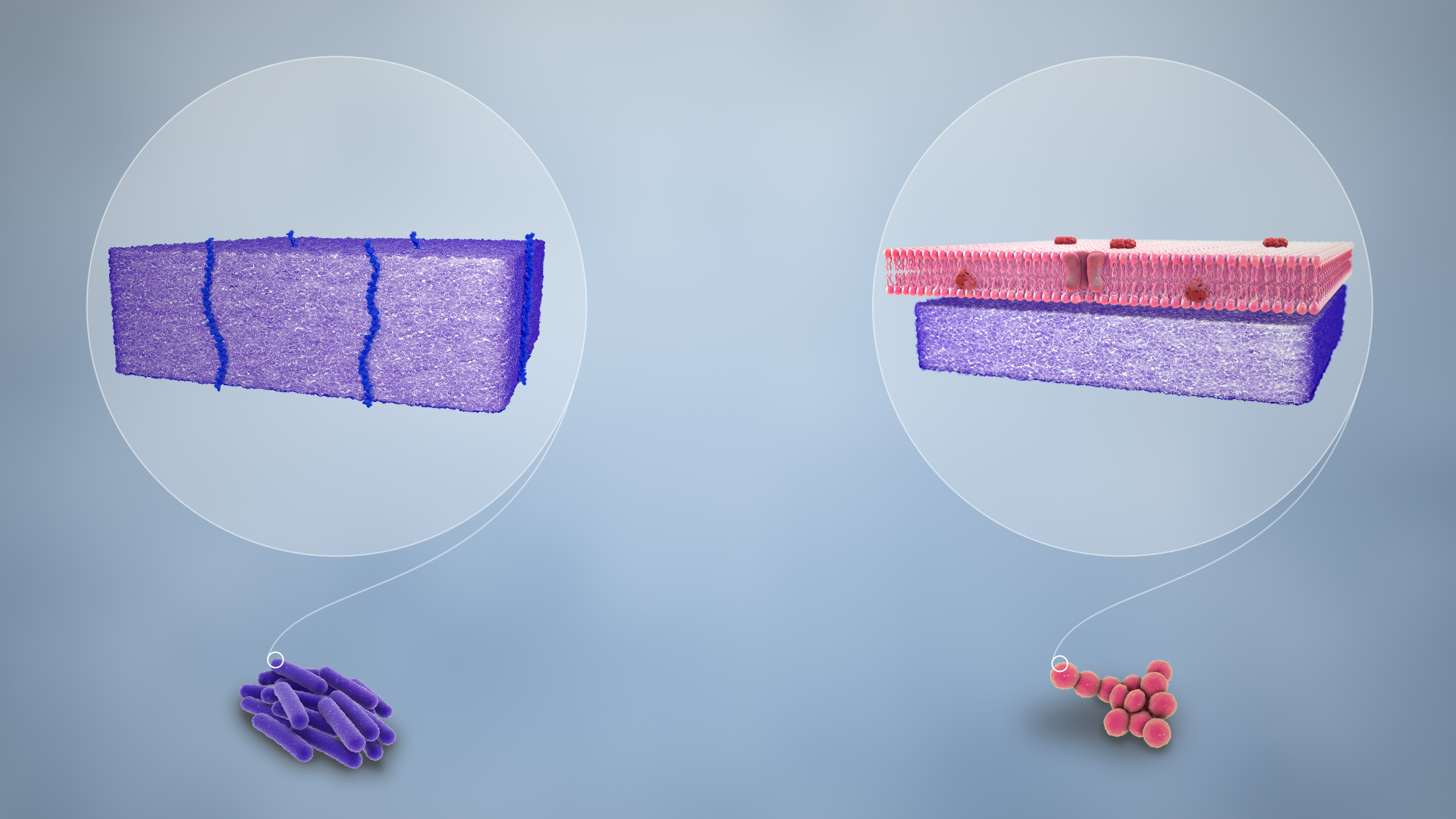
Purple-stained gram-positive (left) and pink-stained gram-negative (right)

Gram-positive bacteria have a thick mesh-like cell wall made of peptidoglycan (50–90% of cell envelope), and as a result are stained purple by crystal violet, whereas gram-negative bacteria have a thinner layer (10% of cell envelope), so do not retain the purple stain and are counter-stained pink by safranin. There are four basic steps of the Gram stain:

1. Applying a primary stain (crystal violet) to a heat-fixed smear of a bacterial culture. Heat fixation kills some bacteria but is mostly used to affix the bacteria to the slide so that they do not rinse out during the staining procedure.
2. The addition of iodine, which binds to crystal violet and traps it in the cell
3. Rapid decolorization with ethanol or acetone
4. Counterstaining with safranin. Carbol fuchsin is sometimes substituted for safranin since it more intensely stains anaerobic bacteria, but it is less commonly used as a counterstain.

Summary of Gram stain
| Application of | Reagent | Cell color | |
| Application of | Reagent | Gram-positive | Gram-negative |
|---|---|---|---|
| Primary dye | crystal violet | purple | purple |
| Trapper | iodine | purple | purple |
| Decolorizer | alcohol/acetone | purple | colorless |
| Counter stain | safranin/carbol fuchsin | purple | pink or red |

Crystal violet (CV) dissociates in aqueous solutions into CV^{+} and chloride (Cl^{−}) ions. These ions penetrate the cell wall of both gram-positive and gram-negative cells. The CV^{+} ion interacts with negatively charged components of bacterial cells and stains the cells purple.

Iodide (I^{−} or I^{−}_{3}) interacts with CV^{+} and forms large complexes of crystal violet and iodine (CV–I) within the inner and outer layers of the cell. Iodine is often referred to as a mordant, but is a trapping agent that prevents the removal of the CV–I complex and, therefore, colors the cell.

When a decolorizer such as alcohol or acetone is added, it interacts with the lipids of the cell membrane. A gram-negative cell loses its outer lipopolysaccharide membrane, and the inner peptidoglycan layer is left exposed. The CV–I complexes are washed from the gram-negative cell along with the outer membrane. In contrast, a gram-positive cell becomes dehydrated from an ethanol treatment. The large CV–I complexes become trapped within the gram-positive cell due to the multilayered nature of its peptidoglycan. The decolorization step is critical and must be timed correctly; the crystal violet stain is removed from both gram-positive and negative cells if the decolorizing agent is left on too long (a matter of seconds).

After decolorization, the gram-positive cell remains purple and the gram-negative cell loses its purple color. Counterstain, which is usually positively charged safranin or basic fuchsine, is applied last to give decolorized gram-negative bacteria a pink or red color. Both gram-positive bacteria and gram-negative bacteria pick up the counterstain. The counterstain, however, is unseen on gram-positive bacteria because of the darker crystal violet stain.

== Examples ==
=== Gram-positive bacteria ===
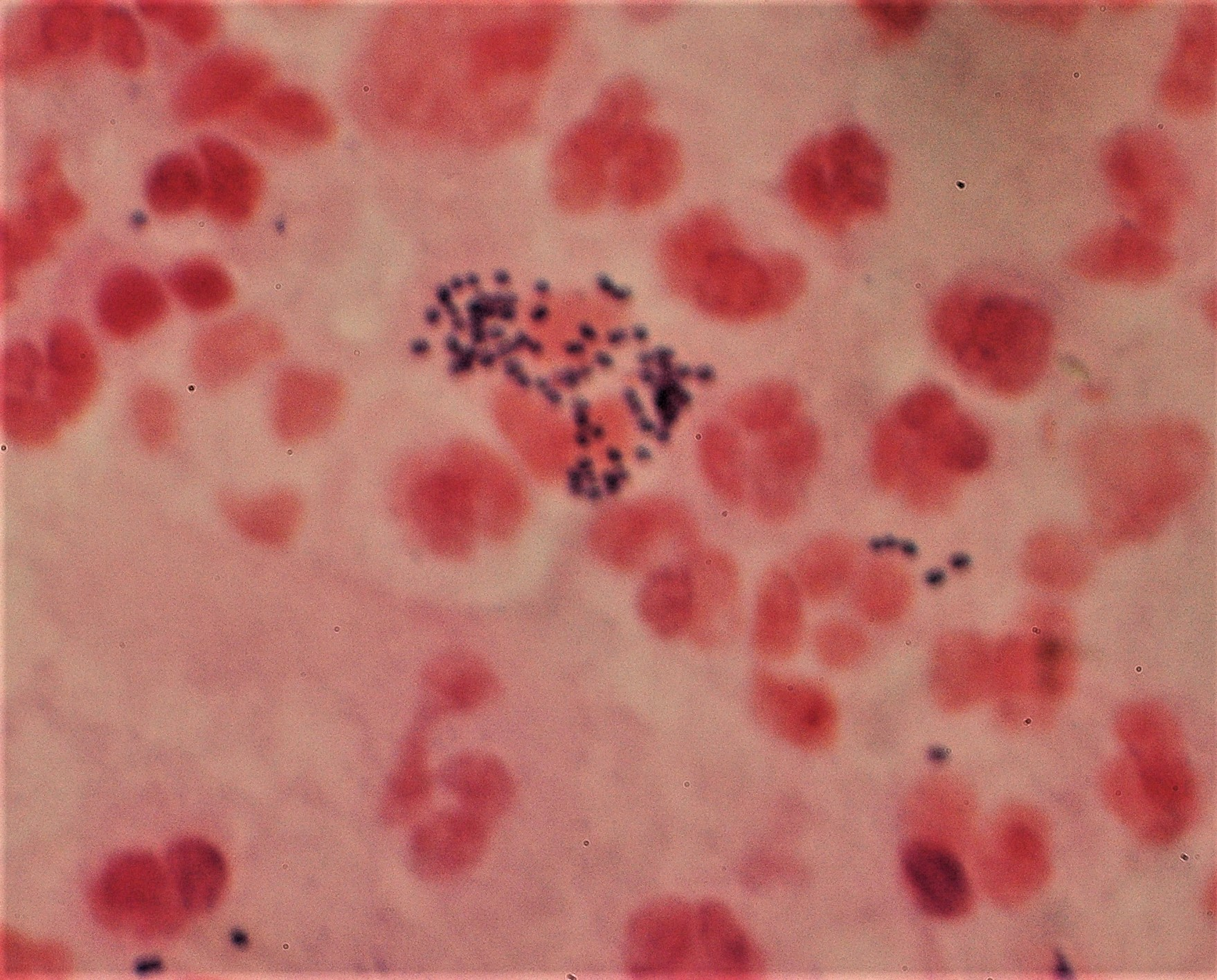
Gram-stain of gram-positive streptococci surrounded by pus cells

Gram-positive bacteria generally have a single membrane (monoderm) surrounded by a thick peptidoglycan. This rule is followed by two phyla: Bacillota (except for the classes Mollicutes and Negativicutes) and the Actinomycetota. In contrast, members of the Chloroflexota (green non-sulfur bacteria) are monoderms but possess a thin or absent (class Dehalococcoidetes) peptidoglycan and can stain negative, positive or indeterminate; members of the Deinococcota stain positive but are diderms with a thick peptidoglycan.

The cell wall's strength is enhanced by teichoic acids, glycopolymeric substances embedded within the peptidoglycan. Teichoic acids play multiple roles, such as generating the cell's net negative charge, contributing to cell wall rigidity and shape maintenance, and aiding in cell division and resistance to various stressors, including heat and salt. Despite the density of the peptidoglycan layer, it remains relatively porous, allowing most substances to permeate. For larger nutrients, Gram-positive bacteria utilize exoenzymes, secreted extracellularly to break down macromolecules outside the cell.

Historically, the gram-positive forms made up the phylum Firmicutes, a name now used for the largest group. It includes many well-known genera such as Lactobacillus, Bacillus, Listeria, Staphylococcus, Streptococcus, Enterococcus, and Clostridium. It has also been expanded to include the Mollicutes, bacteria such as Mycoplasma and Thermoplasma that lack cell walls and so cannot be Gram-stained, but are derived from such forms.

Some bacteria have cell walls which are particularly adept at retaining stains. These will appear positive by Gram stain even though they are not closely related to other gram-positive bacteria. These are called acid-fast bacteria, and can only be differentiated from other gram-positive bacteria by special staining procedures.

=== Gram-negative bacteria ===
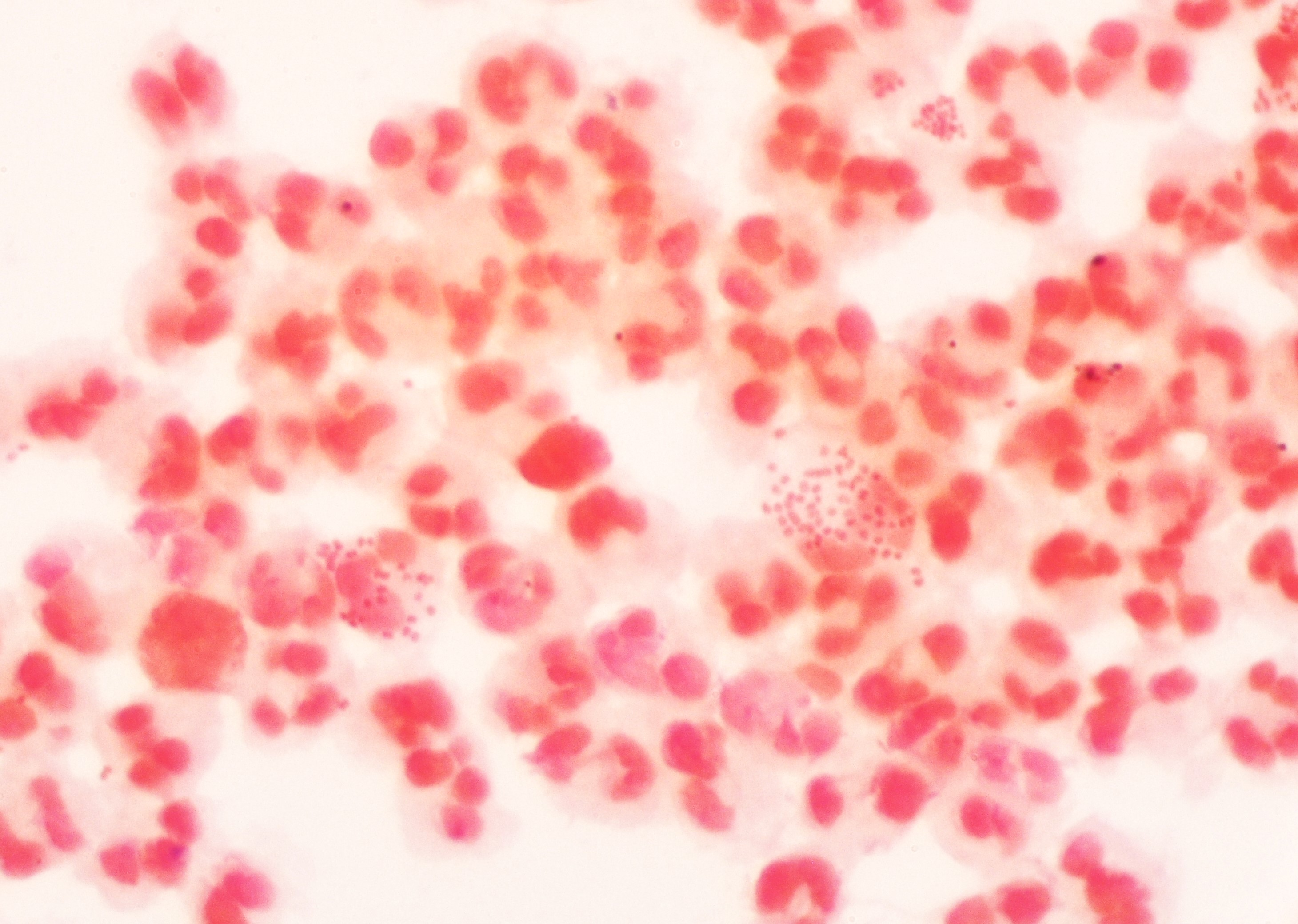
Gram negative Neisseria gonorrhoeae and pus cells

Gram-negative bacteria generally possess a thin layer of peptidoglycan between two membranes (diderm). Lipopolysaccharide (LPS) is the most abundant antigen on the cell surface of most gram-negative bacteria, contributing up to 80% of the outer membrane of E. coli and Salmonella. These LPS molecules, consisting of the O-antigen or O-polysaccharide, core polysaccharide, and lipid A, serve multiple functions including contributing to the cell's negative charge and protecting against certain chemicals. LPS's role is critical in host-pathogen interactions, with the O-antigen eliciting an immune response and lipid A acting as an endotoxin.

Additionally, the outer membrane acts as a selective barrier, regulated by porins, transmembrane proteins forming pores that allow specific molecules to pass. The space between the cell membrane and the outer membrane, known as the periplasm, contains periplasmic enzymes for nutrient processing. A significant structural component linking the peptidoglycan layer and the outer membrane is Braun's lipoprotein, which provides additional stability and strength to the bacterial cell wall.

Most bacterial phyla are gram-negative, including the cyanobacteria, green sulfur bacteria, and most Pseudomonadota (exceptions being some members of the Rickettsiales and the insect-endosymbionts of the Enterobacteriales).

=== Gram-variable and gram-indeterminate bacteria ===
Some bacteria, after staining with the Gram stain, yield a gram-variable pattern: a mix of pink and purple cells are seen. In cultures of Bacillus, Butyrivibrio, and Clostridium, a decrease in peptidoglycan thickness during growth coincides with an increase in the number of cells that stain gram-negative. In addition, in all bacteria stained using the Gram stain, the age of the culture may influence the results of the stain.

Gram-indeterminate bacteria do not respond predictably to Gram staining and, therefore, cannot be determined as either gram-positive or gram-negative. Examples include many species of Mycobacterium, including Mycobacterium bovis, Mycobacterium leprae and Mycobacterium tuberculosis, the latter two of which are the causative agents of leprosy and tuberculosis, respectively. Bacteria of the genus Mycoplasma lack a cell wall around their cell membranes, which means they do not stain by Gram's method and are resistant to the antibiotics that target cell wall synthesis.

== Orthographic note ==
The term Gram staining is derived from the surname of Hans Christian Gram; the eponym (Gram) is therefore capitalized but not the common noun (stain) as is usual for scientific terms. The initial letters of gram-positive and gram-negative, which are eponymous adjectives, can be either capital G or lowercase g, depending on what style guide (if any) governs the document being written. Lowercase style is used by the US Centers for Disease Control and Prevention and other style regimens such as the AMA style. Dictionaries may use lowercase, uppercase, or both. Uppercase Gram-positive or Gram-negative usage is also common in many scientific journal articles and publications. When articles are submitted to journals, each journal may or may not apply house style to the postprint version. Preprint versions contain whichever style the author happened to use. Even style regimens that use lowercase for the adjectives gram-positive and gram-negative still typically use capital for Gram stain.

== See also ==
- Bacterial cell structure
- Ziehl–Neelsen stain
