= Tuberculous lymphadenitis =

- Other names: Scrofula, lymph node tuberculosis
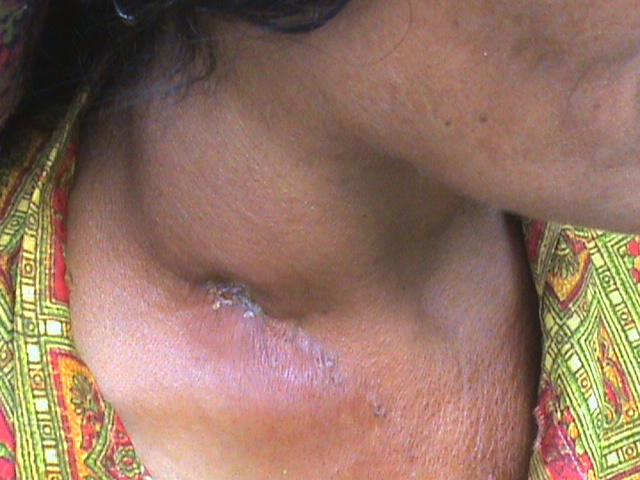
- A case of long-standing tubercular lymphadenitis
- Specialty: Infectious disease
- Symptoms: lymphadenitis, fever, night sweats
- Complications: abscesses and fistulas in the lymph node, spread of the bacteria to other organs
- Causes: Mycobacterium tuberculosis
- Prevention: BCG, ventilation and lighting
- Treatment: Antibiotics
- Prognosis: The case fatality rate of isolated tuberculous lymphadenitis is very low, generally below 1% to 2% in immunocompetent patients receiving the appropriate treatment regimen.
- Frequency: between 25% and 50% of all cases of extrapulmonary tuberculosis

Peripheral tuberculous lymphadenitis (or tuberculous adenitis) is a form of tuberculosis infection occurring outside of the lungs. In general, it describes tuberculosis infection of the lymph nodes, leading to lymphadenopathy. When cervical lymph nodes are affected, it is commonly referred to as "Scrofula." A majority of tuberculosis infections affect the lungs, and extra-pulmonary tuberculosis infections account for the remainder; these most commonly involve the lymphatic system. Although the cervical region is most commonly affected, tuberculous lymphadenitis can occur all around the body, including the axillary and inguinal regions.

The characteristic morphological element is the tuberculous granuloma (caseating tubercule). This consists of giant multinucleated cells and (Langhans cells), surrounded by epithelioid cells aggregates, T cell lymphocytes and fibroblasts. Granulomatous tubercules eventually develop central caseous necrosis and tend to become confluent, replacing the lymphoid tissue.

== Epidemiology ==
The exact prevalence of tuberculous lymphadenitis varies between countries and regions, with higher rates seen in developing countries. Studies have shown that women may have higher rates of tuberculous lymphadenitis compared to men. Conversely, men appear to have higher rates of pulmonary tuberculosis. In regions where tuberculosis is not endemic, many of those affected with tuberculous lymphadenitis are foreign-born. In general, tuberculous lymphadenitis is more frequently seen in immunocompromised patients, such as those with uncontrolled HIV.

== Causes ==
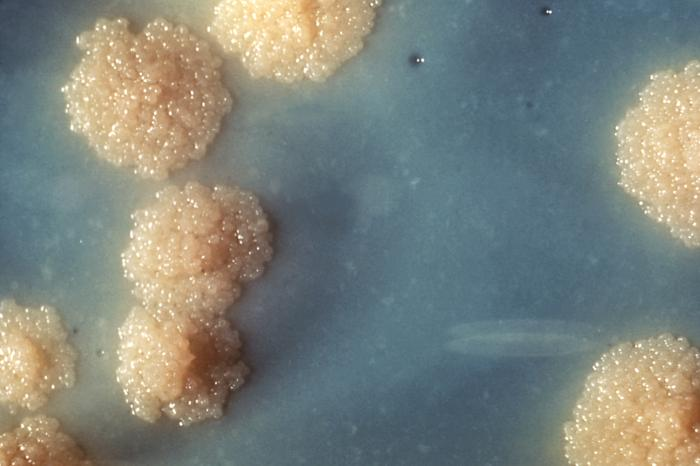
Close-up of a Mycobacterium tuberculosis culture revealing the organism's colonial morphology.

Mycobacterium tuberculosis is the most common cause of both pulmonary tuberculosis and tuberculous lymphadenitis. Historically, transmission of Mycobacterium bovis from dairy consumption was another frequent cause of tuberculous lymphadenitis, but incidence has drastically decreased in developed countries since the advent of pasteurization and other efforts to prevent bovine tuberculosis. Tuberculous lymphadenitis has sometimes been caused by other related bacteria, including M. kansasii, M. fortuitum, M. marinum, and Mycobacterium ulcerans.

== Signs and symptoms ==
Tuberculous lymphadenitis typically involves a gradual and usually painless swelling of the affected lymph nodes (termed lymphadenitis). Duration of symptoms can vary, and ranges between weeks to months following initial onset. Unilateral lymph node involvement accounts for the majority of cases, and involvement of the cervical lymph nodes is the most common.

In addition to swollen lymph nodes, the person may experience mild fevers, decreased appetite, or weight loss. Pulmonary tuberculosis infection may co-occur with tuberculous lymphadenitis and account for additional symptoms such as cough.

== Stages ==
Stages of tubercular lymphadenitis:

1. Lymphadenitis
2. Periadenitis
3. Cold abscess
4. 'Collar stud' abscess
5. Sinus

Tuberculous lymphadenitis is popularly known as collar stud abscess, due to its proximity to the collar bone and its superficial resemblance to a collar stud, although this is just one of the five stages of the disease. One or more affected lymph nodes can also be in a different body part, although it is most typical to have at least one near the collar bone. The characteristic morphological element is the tuberculous granuloma (caseating tubercule): giant multinucleated cells (Langhans cells), surrounded by epithelioid cells aggregates, T cell lymphocytes and few fibroblasts. Granulomatous tubercules evolve to central caseous necrosis and tend to become confluent, replacing the lymphoid tissue.

== Diagnosis ==
Basic steps of the Ziehl-Neelsen staining procedure. This acid-fast staining method, in conjunction with auramine phenol staining, serves as a standard diagnostic tool and is widely used for rapidly diagnosing tuberculosis, leprosy, and Mycobacterium avium-intracellulare infection.

The gold standard for diagnosis of tuberculous lymphadenitis is to obtain a culture, though results may take weeks. A positive acid-fast bacteria (AFB) stain can support the diagnosis. Other possible methods include nucleic acid amplification tests, fine needle aspiration (FNA), or excisional biopsy, the most invasive method.

Supplementary studies to aid in diagnosis include tuberculin skin tests, interferon-gamma release assays, or chest X-rays.

== Treatment ==
Treatment of tuberculous lymphadenitis involves an anti-tuberculosis medication regimen for at least 6 months. This includes isoniazid, rifampin, pyrazinamide, and ethambutol depending on susceptibility to the drug.

While surgical removal of affected lymph nodes alongside antibiotic therapy has shown some efficacy, there are no formal recommendations for surgery to treat tuberculous lymphadenitis.
