= Franz Ziehl =

German bacteriologist

Franz Ziehl (13 April 1857 in Wismar – 7 April 1926) was a German bacteriologist. He was a professor in Lübeck.

Franz Ziehl introduced the carbol fuchsin stain for the tubercle bacillus in 1882. With pathologist Friedrich Neelsen (1854–1898), he developed the Ziehl–Neelsen stain, also known as the acid-fast stain, which is used to identify acid-fast bacteria.
