= Kinyoun stain =

Procedure used to stain certain acid-fast species of bacteria

The Kinyoun method or Kinyoun stain (cold method), developed by Joseph J. Kinyoun, is a procedure used to stain acid-fast species of the bacterial genus Mycobacterium. It is a variation of a method developed by Robert Koch in 1882. Certain species of bacteria have a waxy lipid called mycolic acid, in their cell walls which allow them to be stained with Acid-Fast better than a Gram-Stain. The unique ability of mycobacteria to resist decolorization by acid-alcohol is why they are termed acid-fast. It involves the application of a primary stain (basic fuchsin), a decolorizer (acid-alcohol), and a counterstain (methylene blue). Unlike the Ziehl–Neelsen stain (Z-N stain), the Kinyoun method of staining does not require heating. In the Ziehl–Neelsen stain, heat acts as a physical mordant while phenol (carbol of carbol fuchsin) acts as the chemical mordant.

Summary of acid-fast stain (Kinyoun stain)
Application of	Reagent	Cell colour	
Application of	Reagent	Acid fast	Non-acid fast
Primary dye	Carbol fuchsin	Red	Red
Decolorizer	Acid alcohol	Red	Colorless
Counter Stain	Methylene blue	Red	Blue

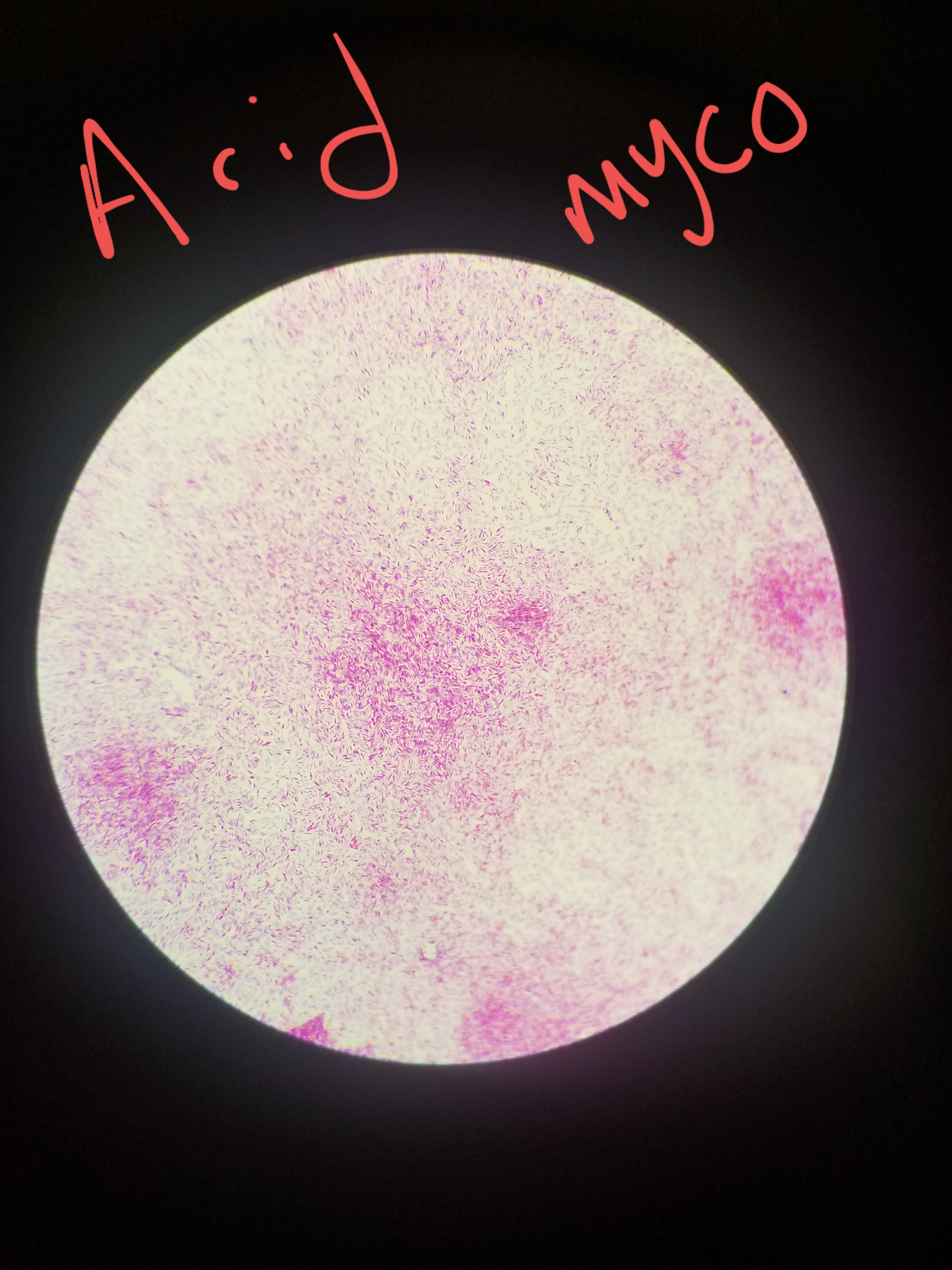
Kinyoun stain on organism Mycobacterium smegmatis

== Modification ==
The Kinyoun method can be modified as a weak acid fast stain, which uses 0.5–1.0% sulfuric acid instead of hydrochloric acid. The weak acid fast stain, in addition to staining Mycobacteria, will also stain organisms that are not able to maintain the carbol fuchsin after decolorizing with HCl, such as Nocardia species and Cryptosporidium.

== See also ==
- Auramine-rhodamine stain
