= Auramine O =

- 340

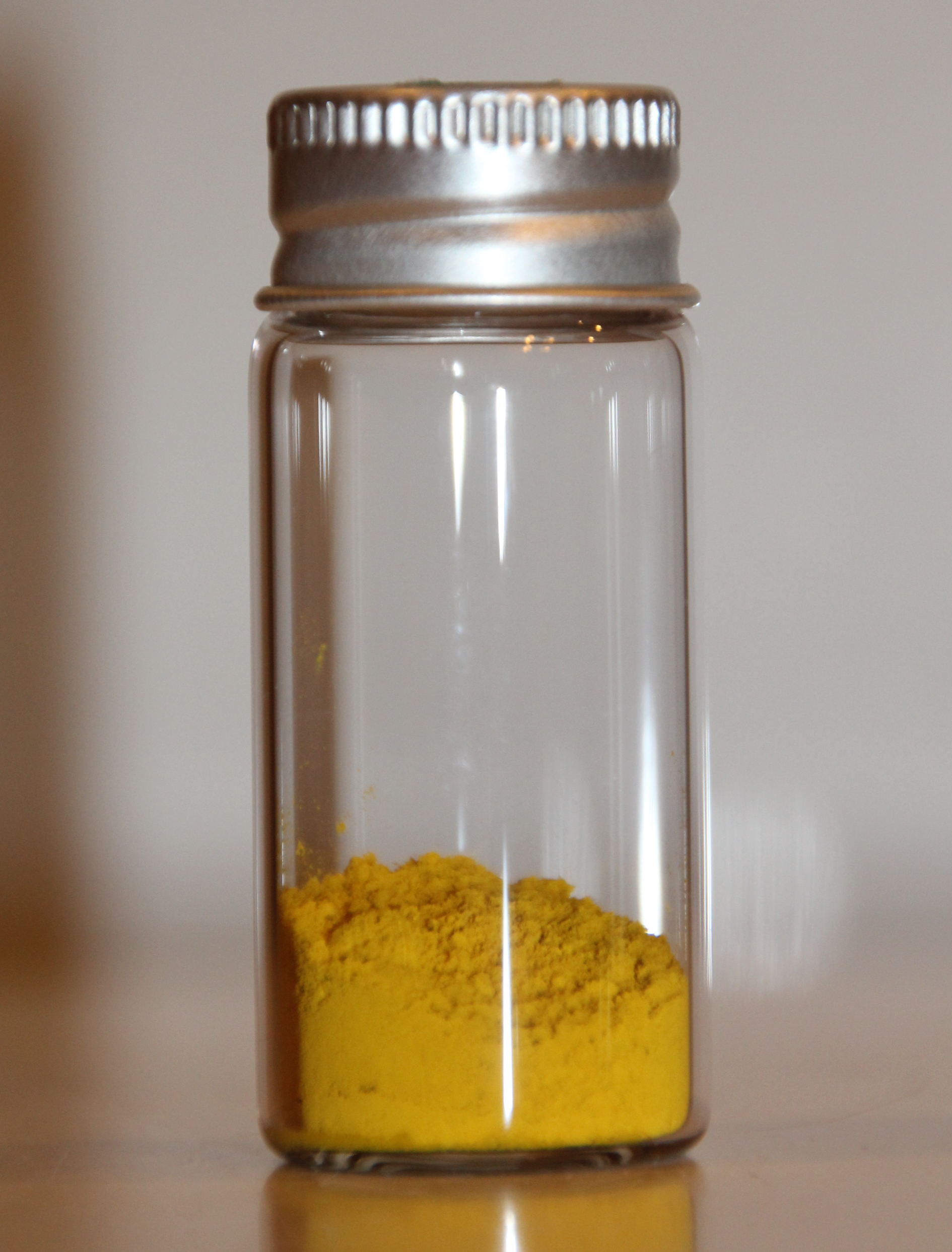
Solid Auramine O
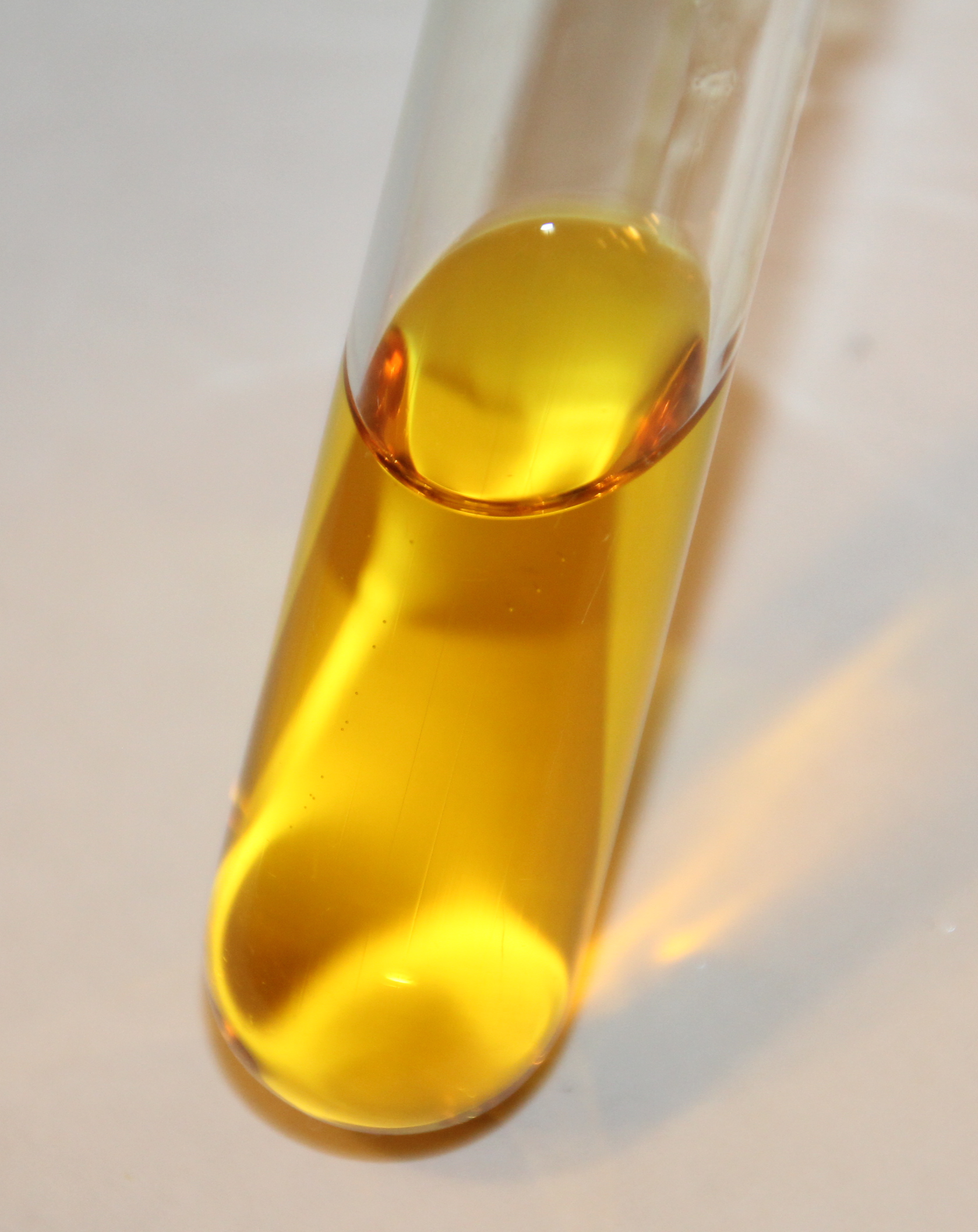
Auramine O in aqueous solution

Names
- IUPAC name bis[4-(dimethylamino)phenyl]methaniminium chloride
- Other names auramine hydrochloride, basic yellow 2, pyocatanium aureum, aizen auramine, pyoktanin yellow, canary yellow, pyoktanin, or C.I. 41000

Identifiers
CAS Number	2465-27-2
3D model (JSmol)	Interactive image; Interactive image
ChemSpider	16254
ECHA InfoCard	100.017.789
EC Number	219-567-2
PubChem CID	17170
UNII	DL992L7W39
CompTox Dashboard (EPA)	DTXSID9020114
- InChI: InChI=1S/C17H21N3.ClH/c1-19(2)15-9-5-13(6-10-15)17(18)14-7-11-16(12-8-14)20(3)4;/h5-12,18H,1-4H3;1H Key: KSCQDDRPFHTIRL-UHFFFAOYSA-N; InChI=1/C17H21N3/c1-19(2)15-9-5-13(6-10-15)17(18)14-7-11-16(12-8-14)20(3)4/h5-12,18H,1-4H3 Key: JPIYZTWMUGTEHX-UHFFFAOYAY; InChI=1/C17H21N3.ClH/c1-19(2)15-9-5-13(6-10-15)17(18)14-7-11-16(12-8-14)20(3)4;/h5-12,18H,1-4H3;1H Key: KSCQDDRPFHTIRL-UHFFFAOYAK
- SMILES: [N@H]=C(c1ccc(N(C)C)cc1)c2ccc(N(C)C)cc2; Cl.[N@H]=C(c1ccc(N(C)C)cc1)c2ccc(N(C)C)cc2

Properties
Chemical formula	C_{17}H_{22}ClN_{3}
Molar mass	303.83 g·mol^{−1}
Melting point	267 °C (513 °F; 540 K)

Hazards
- GHS labelling
Pictograms	(GHS06: Toxic) (GHS07: Exclamation mark) (GHS08: Health hazard) (GHS09: Environmental hazard)
Signal word	Danger
Hazard statements	H302, H311, H319, H351, H411
Precautionary statements	P201, P202, P264, P270, P273, P280, P281, P301+P312, P302+P352, P305+P351+P338, P308+P313, P312, P322, P330, P337+P313, P361, P363, P391, P405, P501
NFPA 704 (fire diamond)	3 1 0
- Except where otherwise noted, data are given for materials in their standard state (at 25 °C [77 °F], 100 kPa). verify (what is ?) Infobox references

Auramine O is a diarylmethane dye used as a fluorescent stain. In its pure form, Auramine O appears as yellow needle crystals. It is insoluble in water and soluble in ethanol and DMSO.

Auramine O can be used to stain acid-fast bacteria (e.g. Mycobacterium, where it binds to the mycolic acid in its cell wall) in a way similar to Ziehl–Neelsen stain. It can also be used as a fluorescent version of the Schiff reagent.

Auramine O can be used together with Rhodamine B as the Truant auramine-rhodamine stain for Mycobacterium tuberculosis. It can be also used as an antiseptic agent.
