= Joseph J. Kinyoun =

American physician (1860–1919)

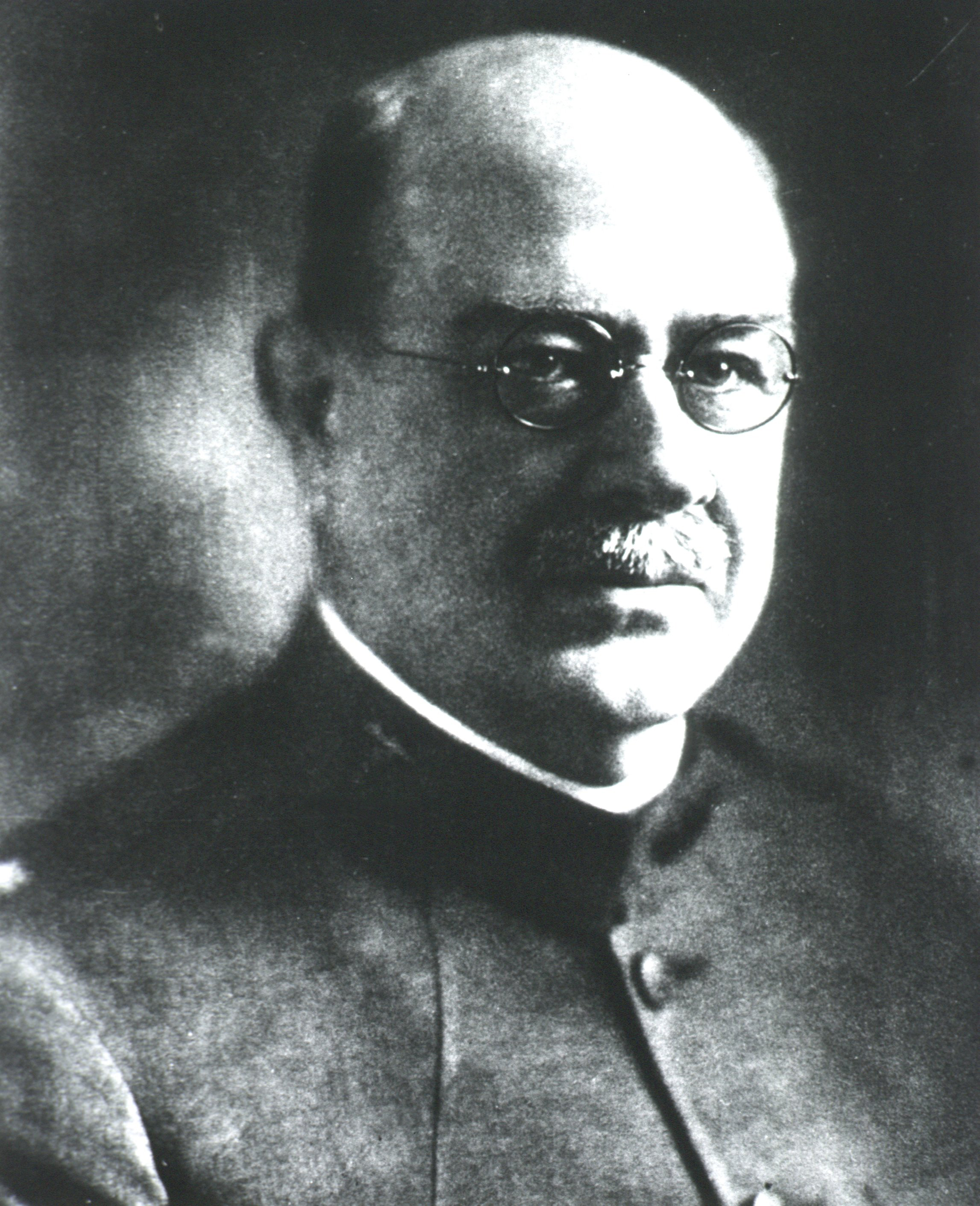

1st Director of the U.S. Hygienic Laboratory
- In office August 1887 – April 30, 1899
- President: Grover Cleveland; Benjamin Harrison; Grover Cleveland; William McKinley
- Succeeded by: Milton J. Rosenau

Personal details
- Born: November 25, 1860 East Bend, North Carolina
- Died: February 14, 1919 (aged 58) Washington, D.C.
- Resting place: Centerview Cemetery; 38°45′01.8″N 93°50′38.7″W
- Children: 5
- Scientific career
- Education: Bellevue Medical College
- Known for: Discovered a bacterial strain of Vibrio cholerae which causes cholera; Founder and first director of the U.S. Laboratory of Hygiene
- Fields: Bacteriology, Public health
- Workplaces: Marine Hospital Service; George Washington University
- Uniformed service
- Allegiance: United States
- Branch: Marine Hospital Service; United States Army
- Service years: 1886–1902; 1917–1919
- Rank: Surgeon (MHS); Major (USA)

Joseph James Kinyoun (November 25, 1860 – February 14, 1919) was an American physician and the founder of the United States' Hygienic Laboratory, the predecessor of the National Institutes of Health.

His career was nearly ended by his insistence, while serving as head of the Marine Hospital Service in San Francisco, on taking vigorous measures to contain the spread of the bubonic plague. He resigned his position in 1901 after being attacked for his diagnoses, including claims by California Governor Henry Gage that he and other federal employees had falsified evidence by injecting cadavers with bacilli. He was ultimately proven correct by independent testing and the appearance of further cases.

Kinyoun's later career was spent in private companies and as a professor of bacteriology and pathology at George Washington University before becoming a bacteriologist for the District of Columbia Health Department, a position he held until his death. In 1909, Kinyoun served as president of the American Society for Microbiology. In 1915, he developed the Kinyoun stain, a procedure used to stain acid-fast bacteria.

== Biography ==
=== Early life ===
Joseph James "Joe" Kinyoun was born November 25, 1860, in East Bend, North Carolina, the oldest of five children born to Elizabeth Ann Conrad and John Hendricks Kinyoun. His family settled in Post Oak, Missouri in 1866 after his house burned down during the Civil War. At the age of 16, he studied medicine with his father, John Hendricks Kinyoun, who was a general practitioner. His family joined a Baptist church.

Kinyoun was educated at St. Louis Medical College and graduated from Bellevue Medical College in 1882 with an M.D. degree. He did postdoctoral studies in pathology and bacteriology at the Carnegie Laboratory, where he became the first bacteriology student and studied cholera. Then he was a visiting scientist in Europe under Robert Koch. He was awarded a Ph.D. from Georgetown University in 1896.

=== Career ===
==== Hygienic Laboratory (1887–1896) ====
On October 4, 1886, Kinyoun began his career in the Marine Hospital Service at Staten Island Quarantine Station as an assistant surgeon, taking over the direction of the Laboratory of Hygiene in 1887. When the Surgeon General moved the laboratory from Staten Island to Washington, DC in 1891, he placed 26-year-old Kinyoun in charge of the nation's first federal bacteriology laboratory. His code name during his MHS career was Abutment.

As the director of the Hygienic Laboratory, he researched on a plethora of different infectious diseases and their respective etiology and vaccine treatment while urging necessary hospital protocols and regulations for isolation of infected patients. Cholera, yellow fever, smallpox, and plague were the four main epidemic diseases that the laboratory investigated.

==== San Francisco Quarantine station (1899–1901) ====
A bubonic plague epidemic that had raged through India and East Asia for nearly fifty years had reached the Hawaiian Islands in 1899. Kinyoun had warned in 1895 that the plague would eventually reach the United States and had begun researching the plague in 1896.

In 1899, Surgeon General Walter Wyman transferred Kinyoun to the San Francisco Quarantine station as head of the Marine Hospital Service for the port, with a promotion to the rank of surgeon (equivalent to lieutenant commander) on August 5. San Francisco, which received ship traffic from Hawaii and a number of other ports where the plague was endemic, was likely to be a key battleground against the spread of the plague.

The federal MHS had an uneasy relationship with state authorities in California, who had clashed with its past enforcement efforts. Wyman ordered Kinyoun to pay no attention to California quarantine officials, which ultimately put Kinyoun at odds with California Governor Henry Tifft Gage during the San Francisco plague of 1900–1904.

A Japanese ship, the S.S. Nippon Maru, arriving in San Francisco Bay in June 1899, had two plague deaths at sea, and there were two more cases of stowaways found dead in the bay, with postmortem cultures proving they had the plague. Similar incidents occurred in other ports: in New York in November 1899, the British ship J.W. Taylor brought three cases of plague from Brazil, but the cases were confined to the ship. The Japanese freighter S.S. Nanyo Maru arrived in Port Townsend, Washington on January 30, 1900, with 3 deaths out of 17 cases of confirmed plague.

In this atmosphere of grave danger, in January 1900, Kinyoun ordered all ships coming to San Francisco from China, Japan, Australia, and Hawaii to fly yellow flags to warn of possible plague on board. Many entrepreneurs and sailing men felt that this was bad for business, and unfair to ships that were free of plague. City promoters were confident that plague could not take hold, and they were unhappy with what they saw as Kinyoun's high-handed abuse of authority.

In January 1900, the four-masted steamship S.S. Australia laid anchor in the Port of San Francisco. The ship sailed between Honolulu and San Francisco regularly. Cargo from Honolulu unloaded at a dock near the outfall of Chinatown's sewers may have allowed rats carrying the plague to leave the ship and transmit the infection. However, it is difficult to trace the infection to a single vessel.

Wherever it came from, the disease was soon established in the cramped Chinese ghetto neighborhood; a sudden increase in dead rats was observed as local rats became infected. Rumors of the plague's presence abounded in the city, quickly gaining the notice of authorities from MHS stationed on Angel Island in San Francisco Bay, including Chief Kinyoun.

On February 7, 1900, Wong Chut King, the owner of a lumber yard, died in his bed after suffering for four weeks. In the morning, the body was taken to a Chinese undertaker, where it was examined by San Francisco police surgeon Frank P. Wilson on March 6, 1900. Wilson called for A.P. O'Brien, a city health department official, after finding suspiciously swollen lymph glands. Wilson and O'Brien then summoned Wilfred H. Kellogg, San Francisco's city bacteriologist, and the three men performed an autopsy as night closed. Looking through his microscope, Kellogg thought he saw plague bacilli. Late at night, Kellogg ran the suspicious samples of lymph fluid to Angel Island to be tested on animals in Kinyoun's better-equipped laboratory - an operation that would take at least four days.

On March 11, Kinyoun's lab presented its results. Two guinea pigs and one rat died after being exposed to samples from the first victim, proving the plague was indeed in Chinatown. On March 13, another lab animal, a monkey who was exposed to the plague, died. All the dead animals tested positive for the plague bacteria.

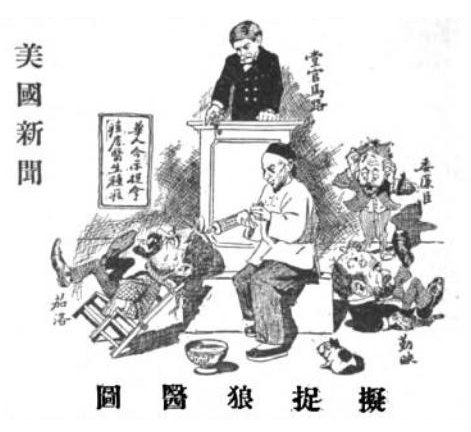
A political cartoon published in a Chinese-language daily paper in June 1900; epidemiologist Joseph J. Kinyoun being injected in the head with Waldemar Haffkine's experimental plague vaccine. Two other doctors appear to be developing buboes on their heads from the oversized inoculations. Federal judge William W. Morrow looks on.

San Francisco authorities initially responded by declaring a quarantine that would have prevented persons of Asian descent from leaving the affected areas, but relaxed the restriction when a Chinese cultural association, claiming that the MHS was violating their rights under the Fourteenth Amendment, obtained a temporary restraining order blocking the quarantine order from federal District Judge William W. Morrow. Residents of San Francisco's Chinatown, resentful of being singled out for blame for the plague by authorities, resisted efforts to inspect their homes.

California Governor Henry Gage, a close ally of the Southern Pacific Railroad and other business interests, joined in the fight. Governor Gage publicly denied the existence of any pestilential outbreak in San Francisco, fearing that any word of the bubonic plague's presence would deeply damage the city's and state's economy. Supportive newspapers, such as the Call, the Chronicle and the Bulletin, echoed and elaborated on Gage's denials, attacking Kinyoun personally.

One newspaper claimed, without any factual basis, that Kinyoun had released his laboratory monkeys into San Francisco. Death threats were made against him, requiring him to travel with bodyguards under an assumed name.

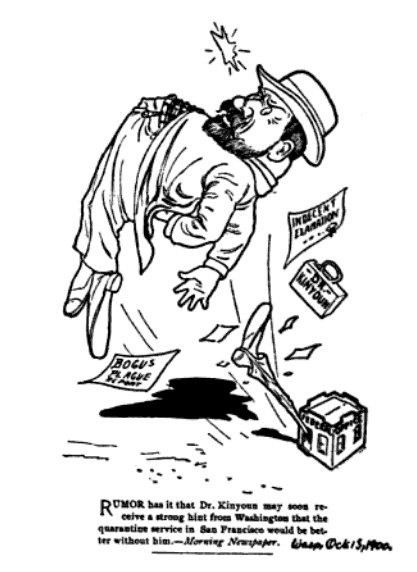
In October 1900, Kinyoun was the subject of a political cartoon about his being kicked out of his federal position.

The clash between Gage and federal authorities intensified. U.S. Surgeon General Walter Wyman instructed Kinyoun to place Chinatown under a second quarantine, as well as blocking all East Asians from entering state borders. Wyman also instructed Kinyoun to inoculate all persons of Asian heritage in Chinatown, using an experimental vaccine developed by Waldemar Haffkine, one known to have severe side effects.

Kinyoun privately argued against the harshest public health measures, warning Wyman that a quarantine might be unconstitutional, and urged California to concentrate its plague control efforts on killing rats rather than imposing quarantine and isolation, but nonetheless carried out Wyman's orders. On May 15, Kinyoun, with Board of Health support, declared an epidemic. The local press claimed that the epidemic was a hoax that Kinyoun had invented to increase his agency's funding.

Gage responded to the declaration by urging California's other elected officials, as well as party leaders and delegates to the Republican National Convention, to put pressure on President William McKinley to reverse the MHS's plague eradication measures and to remove Kinyoun from his position. Behind the scenes, Gage sent a special commission to Washington, D.C., consisting of Southern Pacific, newspaper and shipping lawyers, to negotiate a settlement with the MHS, whereby the federal government would remove Kinyoun from San Francisco with the promise that the state would secretly cooperate with the MHS in stamping out the plague epidemic. Wyman agreed to this proposal, forever damaging his relationship with Kinyoun, who was reassigned to Detroit immediately after the meeting.

Before Kinyoun left for Detroit in May 1901 he had to face one final tribulation: the claim by a deaf-mute fisherman who claimed that Kinyoun, who had vaccinated him, had ordered riflemen to shoot him. Kinyoun initially attempted to avoid arrest by hiding out at an Army post, but turned himself in. He was ultimately exonerated when testimony showed that soldiers pursuing an escaped prisoner had fired warning shots at the fisherman, who was suspected of aiding the escapee, and that Kinyoun had actually intervened to defend him.

Despite the secret agreement for Kinyoun's removal, Gage went back on his promise of assisting federal authorities and continued to obstruct their study and quarantine efforts.

Between 1901 and 1902, the plague outbreak continued to worsen. In a 1901 address to both houses of the California State Legislature, Gage accused federal authorities, particularly Kinyoun, of injecting plague bacteria into cadavers. In response to what he said to be massive scaremongering by the MHS, Gage pushed a censorship bill to gag any media reports of plague infection. The bill failed in the California State Legislature, yet other laws to gag reports amongst the medical community were enacted and $100,000 was allocated to a public campaign led by Gage to deny the plague's existence. In his final speech to the California State Legislature in early January 1903, Gage blamed the federal government, in particular, Kinyoun, the MHS, and the San Francisco Board of Health for damaging the state's economy.

==== Later career ====
Although his colleagues in the MHS and the medical community supported him and urged him not to retire, Kinyoun believed he had no alternative and resigned on May 1, 1902. Two months later, Congress expanded the MHS, renaming it the Public Health and Marine-Hospital Service (later the Public Health Service), and formalized and expanded the Hygienic Laboratory into three new divisions with numerous additional personnel. Kinyoun had drafted this statute. Kinyoun had also been an active supporter of a bill to establish federal regulation of biological products such as serums and vaccines. Congress passed that bill the same day as Kinyoun's bill to expand the MHS.

After leaving government service, Kinyoun went to work for H. K. Mulford Company in Glenolden, Pennsylvania (now part of Merck & Co.), then as a professor of bacteriology and pathology at George Washington University before becoming a bacteriologist for the District of Columbia Health Department, a position he held until his death. He also worked with colleagues at the MHS and other agencies on a variety of public health problems, especially water quality, bacillary dysentery, and hookworm disease in poor Southern children. His interest in disease prevention led him to advocate reforms on public health issues as basic sanitation and hygiene, tuberculosis control, water safety, meat safety, bread quality, and milk sanitation.

Kinyoun was active in many national professional societies, serving as Vice President of the American Society of Tropical Medicine [and Hygiene] during its first full year in 1904 and as First Vice President of the American Public Health Association in 1906. In 1909, Kinyoun served as president of the American Society for Microbiology, which he had helped form more than a decade earlier; he devoted his presidential address to the future of immunology and the still-novel concept of natural and acquired immunity. He took part in many other professional societies, including the American Association for the Advancement of Science and the Association of American Physicians.

In 1915, he developed the Kinyoun stain, a procedure used to stain acid-fast bacteria. It was a variation of a method developed by Robert Koch in 1882.

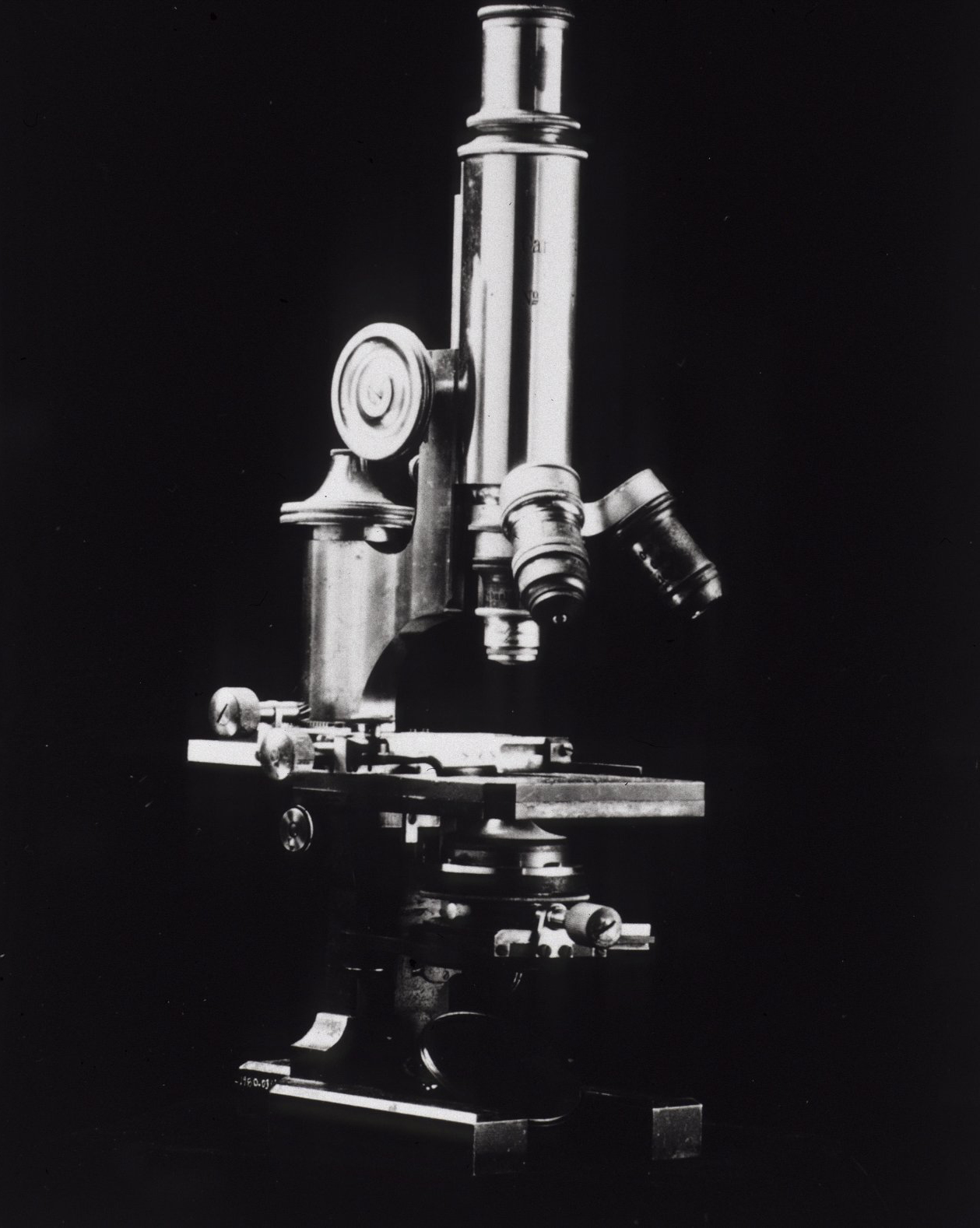
Kinyoun's microscope

He developed a safer, more reliable, and widely used smallpox vaccination technique, the "Kinyoun method," which featured rapid rolling of the needle parallel to the skin surface, and "Kinyoun portable bed disinfectors" for bedding, clothing, dressings, and for killing lice.

== Personal life ==
James and Susan Elizabeth "Lizzie" Perry married in 1883. His wife was active in groups such as the Committee of Women of the National Tuberculosis Congress and the Women’s Committee of the Council of National Defense during the First World War.

The couple had at least five children: Bettie Kinyoun; Joseph Perry Kinyoun; Alice Kinyoun Houts; Conrad Kinyoun; and John Nathan Kinyoun. After his first child, Bettie died at the age of 3 from contracting diphtheria, he poured himself into his work and even set up a public diphtheria laboratory at Georgetown Medical School.

In 1917, Kinyoun joined the Army as an expert epidemiologist assigned to North and South Carolina assigned to investigate statewide typhoid epidemics. During his service he was diagnosed with lymphosarcoma. Joseph Kinyoun died on February 14, 1919, in Washington, DC. A collection of his papers is held at the National Library of Medicine.

== Recognition ==
In 1899, Kinyoun was decorated "in recognition of scientific services," by Venezuela as an Officer of the Order of the Liberator.

The National Institute of Allergy and Infectious Diseases' Joseph J. Kinyoun Memorial Lecture is named in his honor.

== See also ==
- Biologics Control Act
- Kinyoun stain
- List of Liberty ships (Je–L)

Government offices
New office	Director of the Hygienic Laboratory; 1887 – 1899	Succeeded by Milton J. Rosenau
