= Auramine–rhodamine stain =

Histological technique

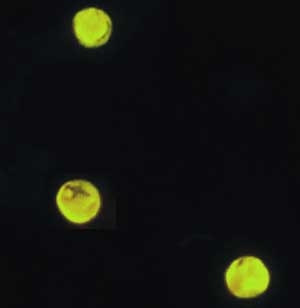
Oocysts of Cryptosporidium parvum stained with the fluorescent auramine–rhodamine stain.

The auramine–rhodamine stain (AR), also known as the Truant auramine–rhodamine stain, is a histological technique used to visualize acid-fast bacilli using fluorescence microscopy, notably species in the Mycobacterium genus. Acid-fast organisms display a reddish-yellow fluorescence. Although the auramine–rhodamine stain is not as specific for acid-fast organisms (e.g. Mycobacterium tuberculosis or Nocardia) as the Ziehl–Neelsen stain, it is more affordable and more sensitive, therefore it is often utilized as a screening tool.

AR stain is a mixture of auramine O and rhodamine B. It is carcinogenic.

== See also ==
- Auramine phenol stain (AP stain)
- Biological stains
