= Friedrich Neelsen =

German pathologist, microbiologist (1854–1894)

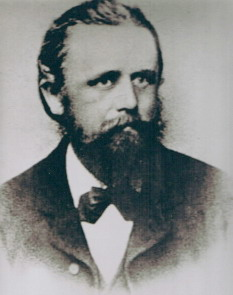
Friedrich Neelsen (1854–1898)

Friedrich Carl Adolf Neelsen (March 29, 1854, Uetersen – April 11, 1894, Dresden) was a German pathologist.

== Life ==
Friedrich C.A. Neelsen was born to Hans Friedrich Neelsen, deacon of the Uetersen vicarage, and his wife Bertha Sophia (née Lueders). He attended school in Uetersen and later in Altona. He studied medicine at the University of Leipzig, from which he received his doctorate at the age of 22. Later he became a professor at the Institute of Pathology of the University of Rostock. His final years were spent as chief of medicine at the famous pathological institute of the Dresden University of Technology. Neelsen died on April 11, 1894, aged 40, presumably due to pathogen exposure during his many years of bacteriological research. He was known in his time as a recluse who avoided public attention whenever possible, though he was active in the civic affairs of his hometown throughout his life.

== Work ==
Together with microbiologist Franz Ziehl, Neelsen developed the Ziehl–Neelsen stain, a method for the staining of acid-fast bacteria, used to this day in the diagnosis of tuberculosis and to detect the presence of other mycobacteria.

== Sources ==
- Uetersener Nachrichten (newspaper) (2005) (de)
