= Mycobacterium psychrotolerans =

Scientific classification
- Domain: Bacteria
- Kingdom: Bacillati
- Phylum: Actinomycetota
- Class: Actinomycetes
- Order: Mycobacteriales
- Family: Mycobacteriaceae
- Genus: Mycobacterium
- Species: M. psychrotolerans

Binomial name
- Mycobacterium psychrotolerans Trujillo et al. 2004

Type strain
- DSM 44697; JCM 13323; LMG 21953; WA 101

Species of bacterium

Mycobacterium psychrotolerans is a rapidly growing mycobacterium first isolated from pond water near a uranium mine in Spain. It was able to grow at 4 °C and is therefore considered to be psychrotolerant. Etymology: psychros, cold; tolerans, tolerating.

== Description ==
Microscopy

- Gram-positive, acid-fast, non-spore-forming, non-motile short rods.

Colony characteristics

- Smooth, entire, bright orange, scotochromogenic colonies appear after 2 days in GYEA, Bennett's and nutrient agars.

Physiology

- Growth on Lowenstein–Jensen agar is moderate.
- No growth occurs on MacConkey agar.
- Grows at 4–37C and tolerates 7% NaCl.
- The type strain is resistant to ampicillin, cefuroxime, cloxacillin, erythromycin, penicillin and polymyxin. Sensitive to ciprofloxacin, gentamicin, neomycin and oxytetracycline.

Differential characteristics

- Growth at 4 °C.

== Pathogenesis ==
- First isolated from an environmental source, not known to be pathogenic.

== Type strain ==
- The type strain was isolated from a pond in Salamanca, Spain.
- Strain WA101 = DSM 44697 = JCM 13323 = LMG 21953
