= Gerhard Armauer Hansen =

Norwegian physician (1841–1912)

Gerhard Henrik Armauer Hansen
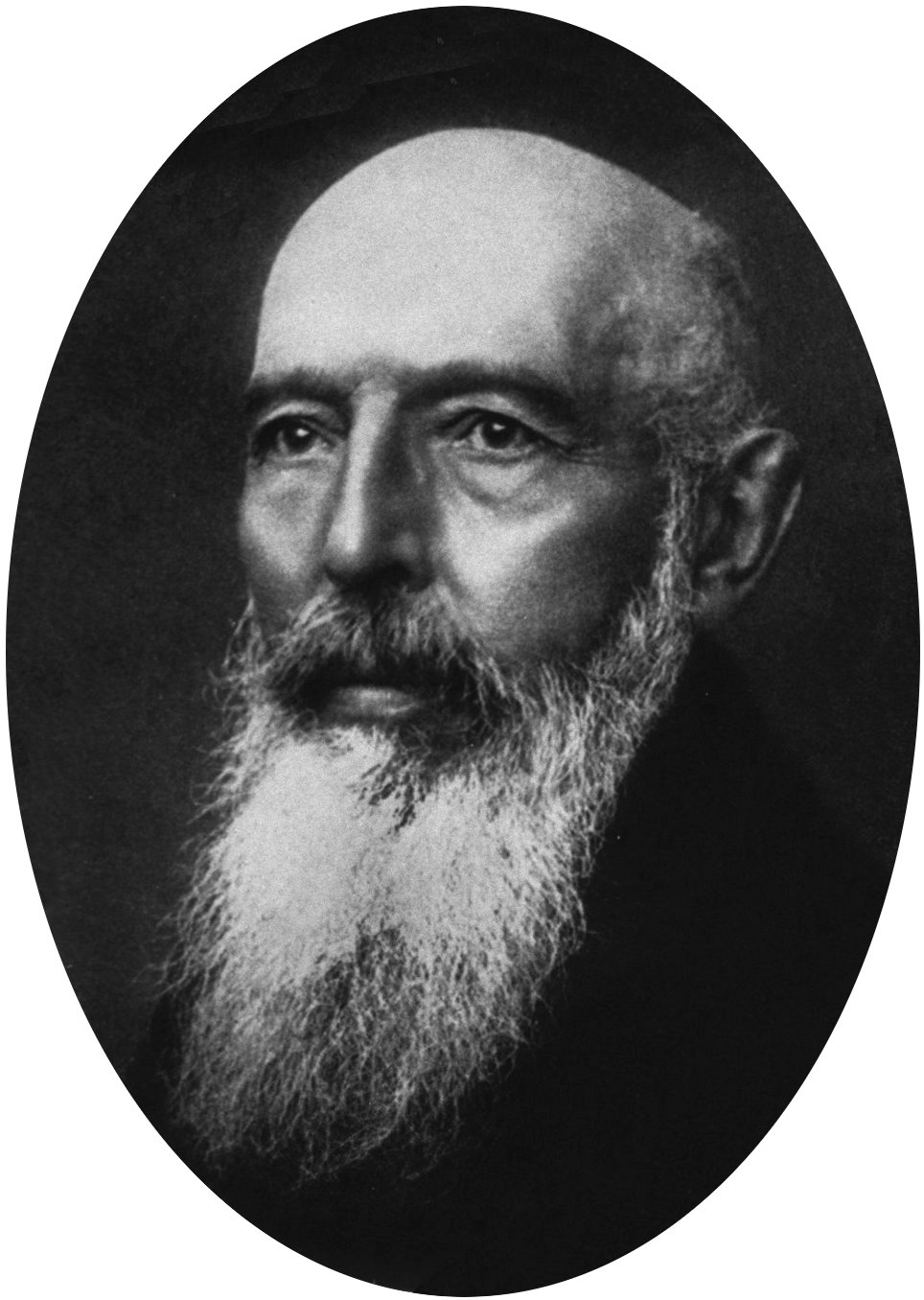
- Gerhard Armauer Hansen
- Born: 29 July 1841; Bergen, Norway
- Died: 12 February 1912 (aged 70); Florø, Norway
- Education: University of Oslo
- Awards: Royal Norwegian Order of St. Olav
- Scientific career
- Fields: Epidemiology

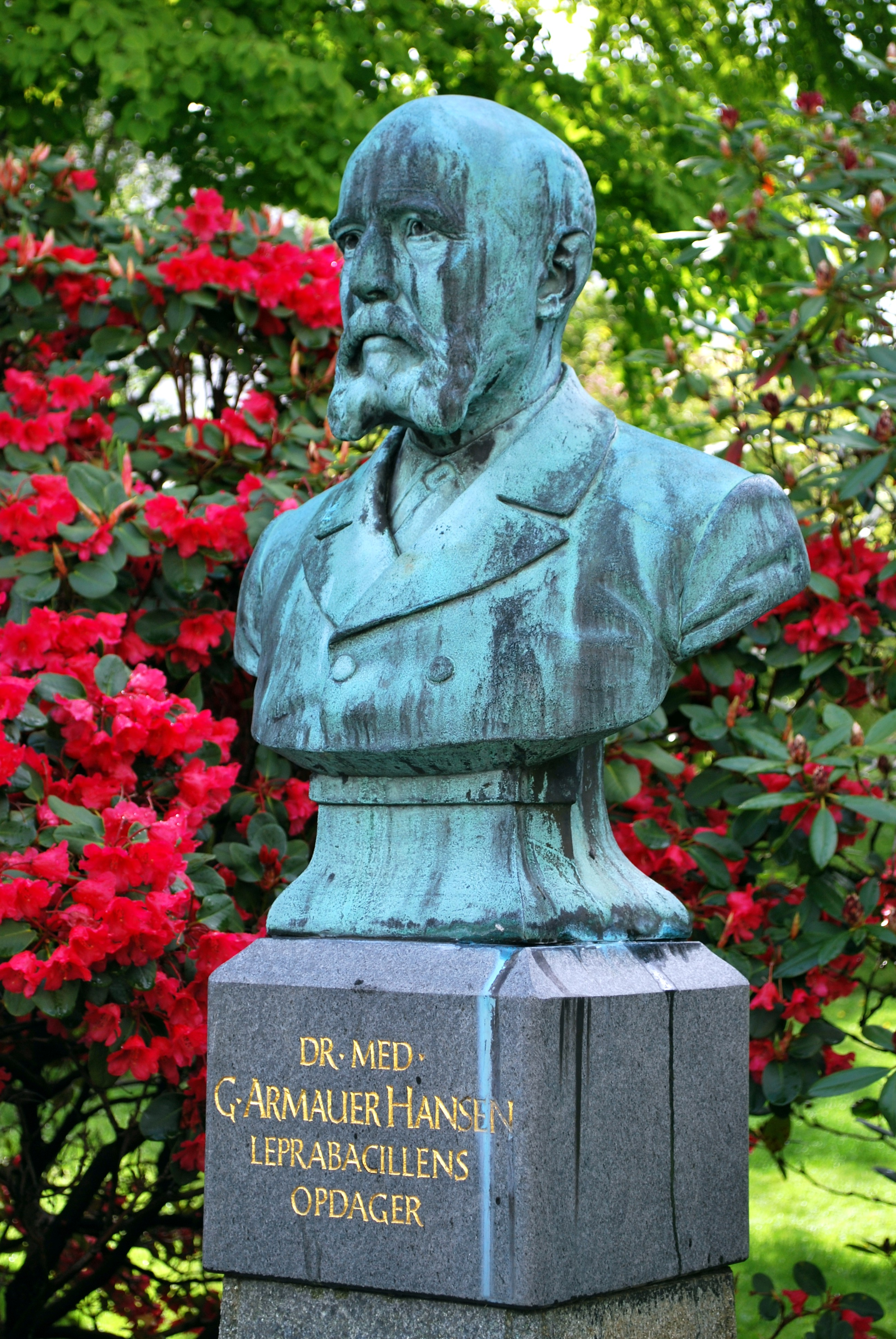
Bust of Dr. Armauer Hansen, Botanical garden, University of Bergen, Norway

Gerhard Henrik Armauer Hansen (Norwegian pronunciation: [ˈɡæ̂rhɑɖ ɑrˈmæ̀ʉər ˈhɑ̂nsn̩]; 29 July 1841 – 12 February 1912) was a Norwegian physician, remembered for his identification of the bacterium Mycobacterium leprae in 1873 as the etiologic agent of leprosy. His distinguished work was recognized at the International Leprosy Congress held at Bergen in 1909.

== Life ==
Hansen was born in Bergen, Norway, and attended the Bergen Cathedral School. He studied medicine at the University of Christiania (present-day University of Oslo), where he graduated with honors in 1866.

He worked at Rikshospitalet in Christiania (now Oslo) and as a doctor in Lofoten. In 1868 Hansen returned to Bergen to study leprosy while working at Lungegård Hospital with Daniel Cornelius Danielssen, a noted expert.

Leprosy was regarded as largely hereditary or otherwise miasmic in origin. Hansen concluded on the basis of epidemiological studies that leprosy was a communicable disease with a specific cause. In 1870–71 Hansen travelled to Bonn and Vienna to gain the training necessary for him to prove his hypothesis. In 1873, he announced the discovery of Mycobacterium leprae in the tissues of all people with the condition, although he did not identify them as bacteria, and received little support. The discovery was made with a "new and better" microscope.

In 1879 Hansen gave tissue samples to Albert Neisser, who then successfully stained the bacteria and announced his findings in 1880, claiming to have discovered the disease-causing organism. Neisser tried to downplay the assistance of Hansen. Hansen's claim was weakened by his failure to produce a pure microbiological culture in an artificial medium, or to prove that the rod-shaped organisms were infectious. Further, Hansen had attempted to infect at least one female patient with the nodular form of leprosy without consent, and although no damage was caused, the case ended up in court and Hansen lost his post at the hospital. The case helped introduce informed consent for medical research in Norway.

Hansen remained medical officer for leprosy in Norway and it was through his efforts that the leprosy acts of 1877 and 1885 were passed, leading to a steady decline of the disease in Norway from 1,800 known cases in 1875 to just 575 cases in 1901.

Hansen had had syphilis since the 1860s but died of heart disease. He was an atheist.

== Women's rights ==
He was a co-founder and a board member of the Bergen chapter of the Norwegian Association for Women's Rights, led by his sister, prominent women's rights advocate Amalie Hansen.

== Honors ==
- Leprosy Museum (Lepramuseet) at St. Jørgen Hospital in Bergen has been dedicated to Hansen.
- Haukeland University Hospital has established Armauer Hansens hus as a research facility operated by the University of Bergen.
- In Jerusalem, a 19th-century leprosarium has borne Hansen's name since 1950. It has been reconstructed into an art center while preserving the physician's surname in its title.
- Armauer Hansen Research Institute (AHRI) in Addis Ababa, Ethiopia under the ministry of Health is named after Hansen. AHRI is a biomedical research institute working in tuberculosis, HIV, malaria, leishmaniasis training, and research.
