= Bismarck brown =

Bismarck brown may refer to the following dyes:

- Bismarck brown R, or basic brown 4
- Bismarck brown Y, or basic brown 1

== See also ==
- List of dyes
