= United States Public Health Service Commissioned Corps officer rank insignia =

Insignia used by multiple US Corps

The United States Public Health Service Commissioned Corps uses the same commissioned officer rank structure as the United States Navy and Coast Guard: from ensign to admiral (O-1 through O-10). While the commissioned corps is authorized to use warrant officer ranks W-1 to W-4 under the U.S. Code of law, it does not currently use these ranks. The corps originated in the Marine Hospital Service, which adopted naval ranks in 1889 to impose military discipline on its doctors.

== Rank insignia ==
Uniformed services pay grade	Special grade	O-10	O-9	O-8	O-7	O-6	O-5	O-4	O-3	O-2	O-1
United States Public Health Service
United States Public Health Service		Admiral	Vice admiral	Rear admiral	Rear admiral (lower half)	Captain	Commander	Lieutenant commander	Lieutenant	Lieutenant (junior grade)	Ensign
Abbreviation		ADM	VADM	RADM	RDML	CAPT	CDR	LCDR	LT	LTJG	ENS
Title		Assistant Secretary for Health	Surgeon general	Deputy surgeon general or Assistant surgeon general	Assistant surgeon general	Medical director	Senior surgeon	Surgeon	Senior assistant surgeon	Assistant surgeon	Junior assistant surgeon
NATO code	OF-10	OF-9	OF-8	OF-7	OF-6	OF-5	OF-4	OF-3	OF-2	OF-1

== History ==
The present-day commissioned corps has its origins in the career corps of the Marine Hospital Service, which was established by federal legislation on January 4, 1889. The service adopted naval ranks in order to impose military discipline on the doctors of the service, and corresponded their service rank and grade with their medical title. The service continues to interchange officer ranks and service titles when referring to their grade.

=== 1889–1902 (Marine Hospital Service) ===
Initially, the officer ranks and insignia of the Marine Hospital Service were as follows:

Marine Hospital Service title	Shoulder strap insignia	Dress uniform sleeve insignia	United States Navy officer equivalent	United States Army officer equivalent
Supervising surgeon general		Five bands of 1/4th inch gold braid	Commodore	Brigadier general
Surgeon (20 years service and over)		Four bands of 1/4th inch gold braid	Commander	Lieutenant colonel
Surgeon (below 20 years service)		Four bands of 1/4th inch gold braid	Lieutenant commander	Major
Passed assistant surgeon		Three bands of 1/4th inch gold braid	Lieutenant	Captain
Assistant surgeon		Two bands of 1/4th inch gold braid	Lieutenant (junior grade)	First lieutenant

Officers of the Marine Hospital Service wore the same rank devices as officers in the armed forces, apart from the star of the surgeon general and the bars of passed assistant surgeons and assistant surgeons being gold instead of silver.

Effective October 1, 1893, the supervising surgeon general wore gold epaulettes in place of shoulder straps. Officers who once served in the grade of surgeon general and were then reverted to the grade of surgeon, were also authorized to wear silver oak leaf insignia regardless of years of service.

The rank structure was further revised with effect from July 1, 1896:

Marine Hospital Service title	Shoulder strap insignia	Dress uniform sleeve insignia	United States Navy officer equivalent	United States Army officer equivalent
Supervising surgeon general		Five bands of 1/4th inch gold braid	Commodore	Brigadier general
Surgeon (20 years service and over)		Four bands of 1/4th inch gold braid (with 20 years service and over)	Commander	Lieutenant colonel
Surgeon (below 20 years service)	(if previously served as surgeon general)	Three bands of 1/4th inch gold braid	Commander or Lieutenant commander	Lieutenant colonel or Major
Passed assistant surgeon		Three bands of 1/4th inch gold braid	Lieutenant	Captain
Assistant surgeon		Two bands of 1/4th inch gold braid	Lieutenant (junior grade)	First Lieutenant

=== 1902–1912 (Public Health and Marine Hospital Service) ===
By Act of Congress, on July 1, 1902, the Marine Hospital Service became the United States Public Health and Marine Hospital Service. The rank structure was correspondingly expanded, with the creation of the rank of assistant surgeon general.

The rank structure of the new Public Health and Marine Hospital Service was the following:

Public Health and Marine Hospital Service title	Shoulder strap insignia	Dress uniform sleeve insignia	United States Navy officer equivalent	United States Army officer equivalent
Surgeon general		Band of 2-inch gold braid with band of 1/2 inch gold braid above	-	Brigadier general
Assistant surgeon general		Three bands of 1/2 inch gold braid with two bands of 1/4th inch gold braid interspersed	Captain	Colonel
Surgeon (20 years service and over)		Four alternating bands of gold braid, two of 1/2 inch and two of 1/4th inch diameter	Commander	Lieutenant colonel
Surgeon (below 20 years service)		Two bands of 1/2 inch gold braid with band of 1/4th inch gold braid between	Lieutenant commander	Major
Passed assistant surgeon		Band of 1/2 inch gold braid, with band of 1/4th inch gold braid above	Lieutenant	Captain
Assistant surgeon		Band of 1/2 inch gold braid	Lieutenant (junior grade)	First lieutenant

=== From 1912 (Public Health Service) ===
The United States Public Health Service was established by Act of Congress on August 14, 1912. In March 1914, the five-pointed gold star worn by the surgeon general was changed to silver, with the new rank of senior surgeon introduced between the ranks of surgeon and assistant surgeon general. The sleeve rank insignia were also altered to match those worn by Navy officers, with shoulder loops replacing straps. With effect from March 20, 1918, the gold bars worn by the ranks of passed assistant and assistant surgeons became silver, the same as the equivalent Army and Navy rank insignia. At the end of World War I, the rank insignia of the Commissioned Corps were as follows:

Public Health Service title	Shoulder loop insignia	Dress uniform sleeve insignia	United States Navy officer equivalent	United States Army officer equivalent
Surgeon general		Band of 2-inch gold braid with band of 1/2 inch gold braid above	-	Brigadier general
Assistant surgeon general		Four bands of 1/2 inch gold braid	Captain	Colonel
Senior surgeon		Three bands of 1/2 inch gold braid	Commander	Lieutenant colonel
Surgeon		Two bands of 1/2 inch gold braid with band of 1/4th inch gold braid in between	Lieutenant commander	Major
Passed assistant surgeon		Two bands of 1/2 inch gold braid	Lieutenant	Captain
Assistant surgeon		Band of 1/2 inch gold braid with band of 1/4th inch gold braid above	Lieutenant (junior grade)	First lieutenant

By an Act of April 9, 1930, the grade of surgeon general was raised to two-star rank.

A further Act in 1943 raised the four existing bureau chiefs to the grade of assistant surgeon general with the equivalency to the rank of brigadier general. With the Public Health Service Act of 1944, the grade of passed assistant was redesignated to senior assistant, and the new grade of junior assistant was established as equivalent to rank of second lieutenant or ensign. The 1944 Act further established the grade of director, to rank equivalent with a colonel or Navy captain, along with the one-star graded post of deputy surgeon general, also elevating assistant surgeons general to one-star rank. The surgeon general was also elevated to two-star rank. At the end of World War II, the ranks and insignia of the Public Health Service Commissioned Corps were:

Public Health Service title	Shoulder loop insignia	Dress uniform sleeve insignia	United States Navy officer equivalent	United States Army officer equivalent
Surgeon general		Band of 2-inch gold braid with band of 1/2 inch gold braid above	Rear admiral	Major general
Deputy surgeon general Assistant surgeon general		Band of 2-inch gold braid	Commodore	Brigadier general
Director		Four bands of 1/2 inch gold braid	Captain	Colonel
Senior		Three bands of 1/2 inch gold braid	Commander	Lieutenant colonel
Full		Two bands of 1/2 inch gold braid with band of 1/4th inch gold braid in between	Lieutenant commander	Major
Senior assistant		Two bands of 1/2 inch gold braid	Lieutenant	Captain
Assistant		Band of 1/2 inch gold braid with band of 1/4th inch gold braid above	Lieutenant (junior grade)	First lieutenant
Junior assistant		Band of 1/2 inch gold braid	Ensign	Second lieutenant

A further act of February 28, 1948 authorized two grades for officers in the grade of assistant surgeons general, with not more than half of the authorized number to hold the grade equivalent to major generals or rear admirals. Public Law 89-288 was enacted on October 22, 1965, elevating the grade of surgeon general to three-star rank.
