= Ziehl–Neelsen stain =

Bacteriological technique

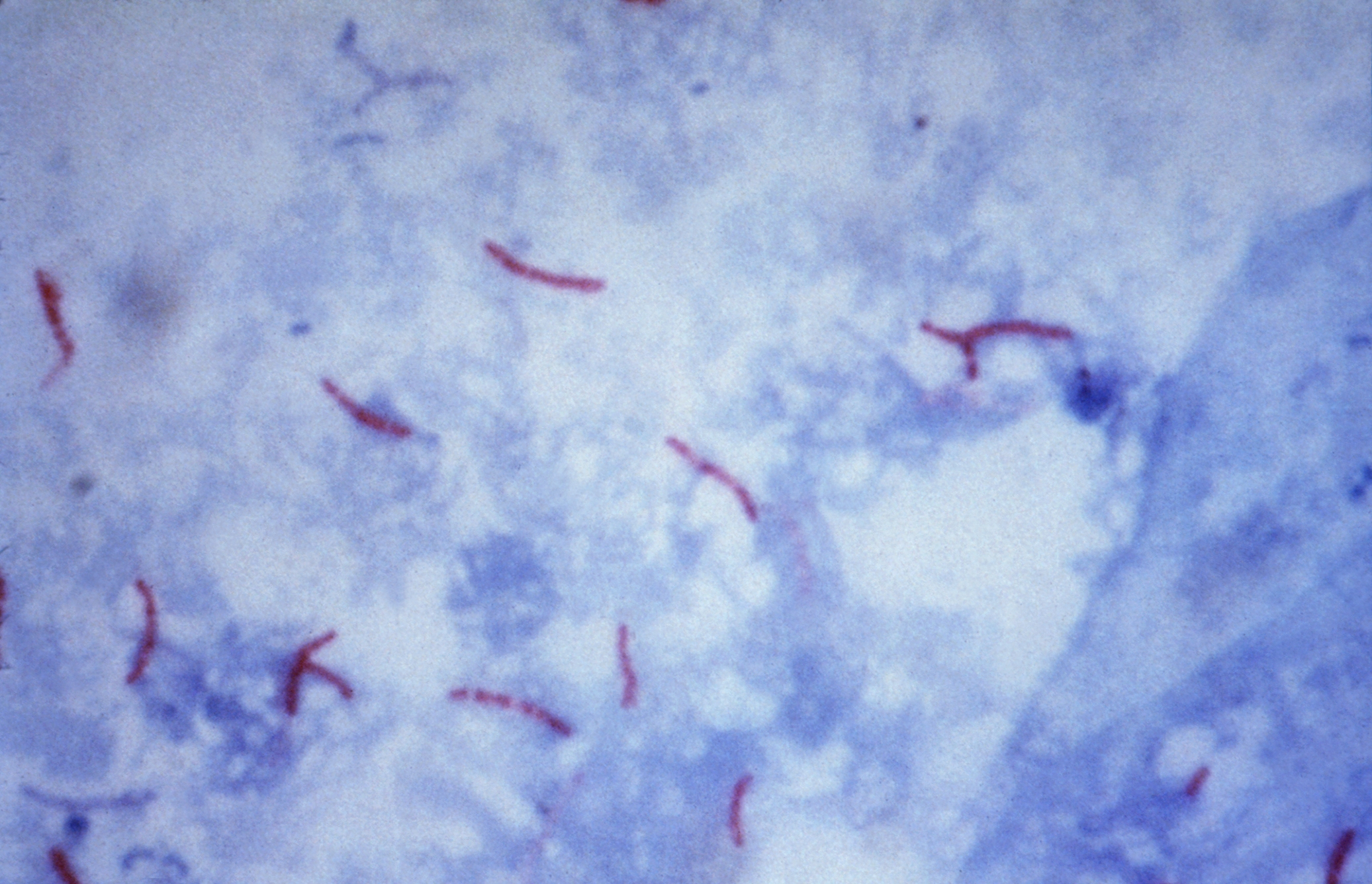
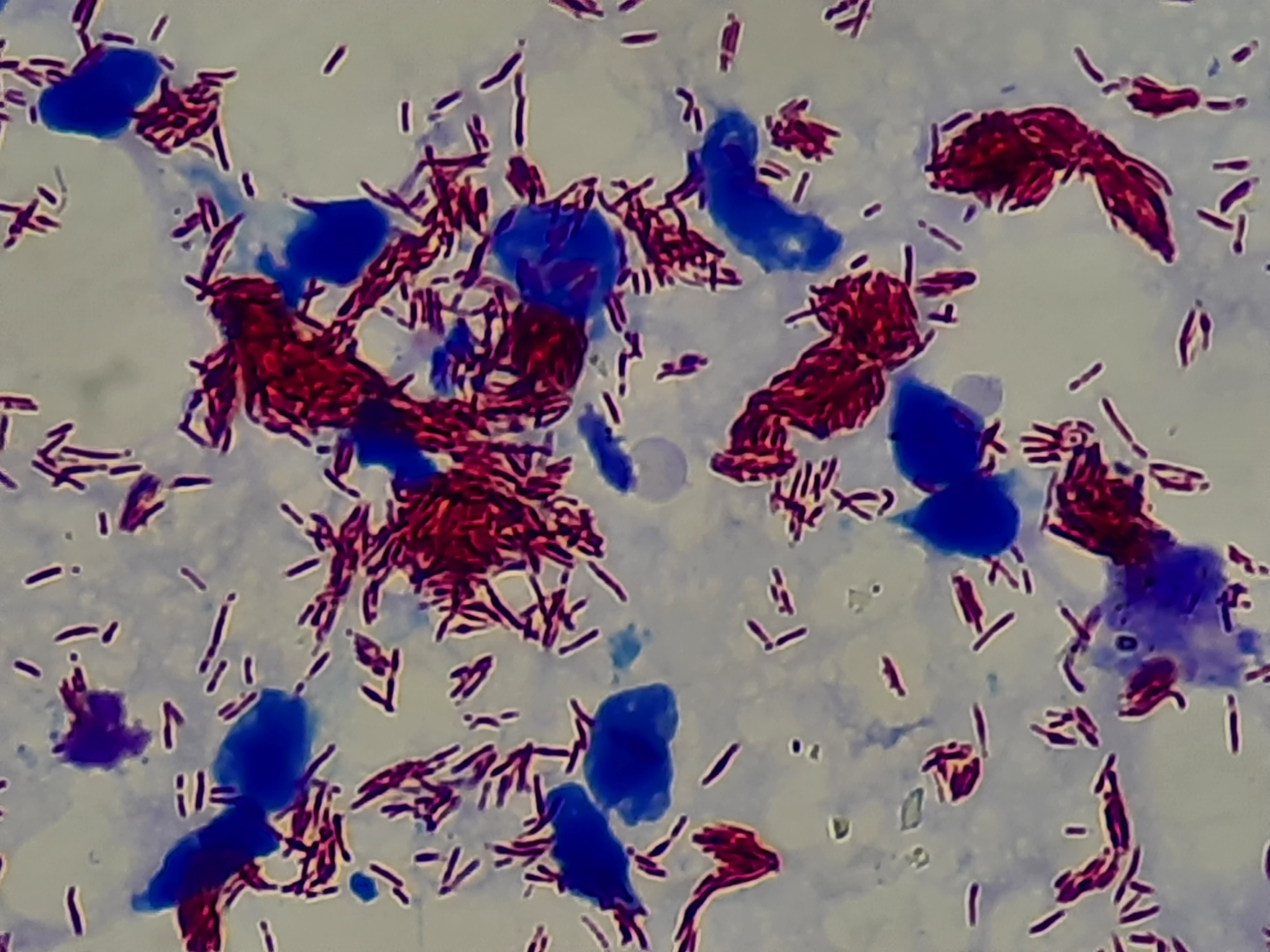
Microscopic visualisation of the acid-fast bacteria Mycobacterium tuberculosis (top) and Mycobacterium leprae (bottom) and background cellular material in blue using the Ziehl–Neelsen stain

The Ziehl–Neelsen stain, also known as the acid-fast stain, is a bacteriological staining technique used in cytopathology and microbiology to identify acid-fast bacteria under microscopy, particularly members of the Mycobacterium genus. This staining method was initially introduced by Paul Ehrlich (1854–1915) and subsequently modified by the German bacteriologists Franz Ziehl (1859–1926) and Friedrich Neelsen (1854–1898) during the late 19th century.

The acid-fast staining method, in conjunction with auramine phenol staining, serves as the standard diagnostic tool and is widely accessible for rapidly diagnosing tuberculosis (caused by Mycobacterium tuberculosis) and other diseases caused by atypical mycobacteria, such as leprosy (caused by Mycobacterium leprae) and Mycobacterium avium-intracellulare infection (caused by Mycobacterium avium complex) in samples like sputum, gastric washing fluid, and bronchoalveolar lavage fluid. These acid-fast bacteria possess a waxy lipid-rich outer layer that contains high concentrations of mycolic acid, rendering them resistant to conventional staining techniques like the Gram stain.

After the Ziehl–Neelsen staining procedure using carbol fuchsin, acid-fast bacteria are observable as vivid red or pink rods set against a blue or green background, depending on the specific counterstain used, such as methylene blue or malachite green, respectively. Non-acid-fast bacteria and other cellular structures will be colored by the counterstain, allowing for clear differentiation.

== Procedure ==
Basic steps of the Ziehl-Neelsen staining procedure

A typical AFB stain procedure involves dropping the cells in suspension onto a slide, then air drying the liquid and heat fixing the cells.

Summary of acid-fast stain (Ziehl–Neelsen stain)
| Application of | Reagent | Cell colour | |
| Application of | Reagent | Acid fast | Non-acid fast |
| Primary dye | Carbol fuchsin | Red | Red |
| Decolorizer | Acid alcohol | Red | Colorless |
| Counter stain | Methylene blue/malachite green | Red | Blue |

"Acid alcohol" refers to an alcohol (reagent/solvent-grade; often denatured for tax reasons) solution of hydrochloric acid. Water is present in some versions. The percentage refers to the acid content by volume.

== Mechanism explanation ==
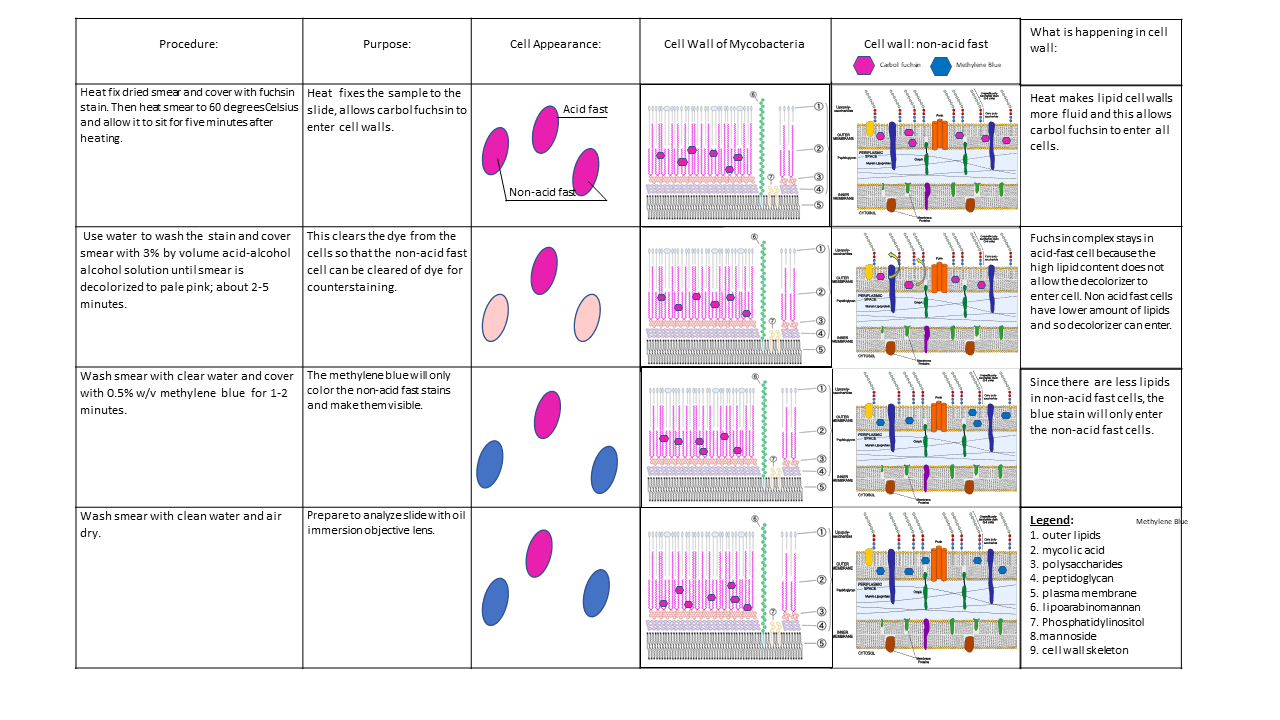
Mechanism of acid-fast staining in acid-fast cells and non-acid-fast cell

The mechanism of action of the Ziehl–Neelsen stain has long been discussed and is not completely understood. Historically, it was believed to involve a chemical reaction between the acidic dyes and the cell walls of the bacteria. The acidity of the dyes was thought to cause them to bind strongly to the lipid-rich cell walls—particularly to mycolic acids—resulting in the selective staining of only those cells that possess a thick, waxy envelope. This traditional view held that these cell-wall lipids were responsible for the retention of the primary dye after acid–alcohol decolourisation, explaining the “acid-fast” property of mycobacteria and related organisms.

The Ziehl–Neelsen stain is a two-step staining process. In the first step, the tissue is stained with a basic fuchsin solution, which stains all cells pink. In the second step, the tissue is incubated in an acid-alcohol solution, which decolourises all cells except for acid-fast cells, which retain the colour and appear red. The mechanisms by which this colour is produced were historically thought to involve an interaction of basic fuchsin with cell-wall components, creating a stable dye complex responsible for the observed red coloration.

Recent studies have provided a more detailed and experimentally supported interpretation of this process, however alternative hypotheses to the structures stained, including nucleic acids were proposed. Fluorescence and confocal microscopy show that the primary dyes (carbol fuchsin and auramine O) actually localise to intracellular nucleic acids (DNA and RNA) rather than to the cell wall itself. In this updated model, the cell envelope’s role is mainly to prevent the loss of these dyes during acid–alcohol washing, rather than to act as the dye-binding target. This intracellular localisation explains the characteristic “beading” pattern observed in Ziehl–Neelsen and fluorescent acid-fast stains, corresponding to the bacterial nucleoids. Similar nucleic-acid staining patterns are seen in other acid-fast organisms such as Cryptosporidium, Cystoisospora, and Schistosoma spp. These findings indicate that acid-fast stains function primarily as nucleic-acid stains whose retention depends on cell-wall integrity rather than direct binding to mycolic acids.

== Organisms that stain as acid-fast ==
=== Mycobacteria ===
Mycobacterium are slow-growing rod-shaped bacilli that are slightly curved or straight, and are considered to be Gram positive. Some mycobacteria are free-living saprophytes, but many are pathogens that cause disease in animals and humans. Mycobacterium bovis causes tuberculosis in cattle. Since tuberculosis can be spread to humans, milk is pasteurized to kill any of the bacteria. Mycobacterium tuberculosis that causes tuberculosis (TB) in humans is an airborne bacterium that typically infects the human lungs. Testing for TB includes blood testing, skin tests, and chest X-rays. When looking at the smears for TB, it is stained using an acid-fast stain. These acid-fast organisms like Mycobacterium contain large amounts of lipid substances within their cell walls called mycolic acids. These acids resist staining by ordinary methods such as a Gram stain. It can also be used to stain a few other bacteria, such as Nocardia (which also belongs in Mycobacteriales).

Studies have shown that an AFB stain without a culture has a poor negative predictive value. An AFB culture should be performed along with an AFB stain; this has a much higher negative predictive value.

In anatomic pathology specimens, immunohistochemistry and modifications of Ziehl–Neelsen staining (such as Fite-Faraco staining) have comparable diagnostic utility in identifying Mycobacterium. Both of them are superior to traditional Ziehl–Neelsen stain.

Recent evidence suggests that the low sensitivity of acid-fast stains in histologic sections may be partly due to tissue processing rather than bacterial scarcity. Standard xylene deparaffinization, routinely used in histopathology, damages the lipid-rich envelope of mycobacteria and markedly reduces fluorescence and detectability with both Ziehl–Neelsen and fluorescent stains. A solvent-free, heat-based projected hot-air deparaffinization method significantly increased the yield and fluorescence intensity of mycobacteria in formalin-fixed, paraffin-embedded tissues, without compromising tissue morphology. These results indicate that the integrity of the mycobacterial cell wall is essential for acid-fastness and that xylene treatment should be avoided when possible. Fluorescent Auramine O staining, which targets intracellular nucleic acids, performed better than carbol fuchsin and may represent a superior option for histologic diagnosis of paucibacillary tuberculosis.

=== Coccidia ===
Auramine O and Ziehl–Neelsen stains are also useful for detecting intestinal coccidia, particularly Cryptosporidium and Cystoisospora species. These organisms exhibit partial or full acid-fastness, with oocysts appearing as bright yellow-green (auramine) or pink-red (Ziehl–Neelsen) structures against a contrasting background. Screening of auramine-stained smears of fecal samples has been shown to markedly improve detection rates of coccidial infections in routine diagnostics, providing a rapid and inexpensive method suitable for large-scale screening programs. These findings are consistent with the broader interpretation that acid-fast stains act primarily as nucleic-acid stains whose retention depends on the integrity of the oocyst wall rather than lipid composition.

=== Fungi ===
Ziehl–Neelsen staining is considered a narrow-spectrum fungal stain. In other words, it is selective in what kinds of fungi it stains, so it can help differentiate and identify fungi. The results of Ziehl–Neelsen staining are variable because many fungal cell walls are not acid-fast.

An example of a common type of acid-fast fungus that is usually stained with Ziehl–Neelsen staining is Histoplasma. Histoplasma is found in soil and the feces of birds and bats. Humans can contract histoplasmosis by inhalation of the fungal spores. The yeast forms reach the bloodstream and may affect lymph nodes and other organs.

=== Schistosoma ===
More recently, acid-fast and fluorescent stains have been shown to highlight structures in the eggs of Schistosoma species. Both Ziehl–Neelsen and auramine O staining demonstrate characteristic fluorescence or chromatic enhancement along the eggshell and within internal structures. This has diagnostic relevance, as it may assist in the recognition of eggs in stool and urine samples, particularly in low-intensity infections or after partial degradation. Fluorescent staining with auramine O has been proposed as a rapid adjunct technique for screening schistosomiasis in endemic regions and differentiating species based on distinct staining patterns. Earlier work had also demonstrated that Ziehl–Neelsen staining can highlight both the shell and species-specific internal features of schistosome eggs, supporting its diagnostic and taxonomic value. These findings, together with fluorescence studies on other acid-fast organisms, further support the interpretation that acid-fast stains primarily target nucleic acids and can reveal diagnostically relevant structures beyond bacteria.

== History ==
In 1882 Robert Koch discovered the etiology of tuberculosis. Soon after Koch's discovery, Paul Ehrlich developed a stain for mycobacterium tuberculosis, called the alum hematoxylin stain. Franz Ziehl then altered Ehrlich's staining technique by using carbolic acid as the mordant. Friedrich Neelsen kept Ziehl's choice of mordant but changed the primary stain to carbol fuchsin. Ziehl and Neelsen's modifications together have developed the Ziehl–Neelsen stain. Another acid-fast stain was developed by Joseph Kinyoun by using the Ziehl–Neelsen staining technique but removing the heating step from the procedure. This new stain from Kinyoun was named the Kinyoun stain.

== Modifications ==
- 1% sulfuric acid alcohol for Actinomycetes, Nocardia.
- 0.5–1% sulfuric acid alcohol for oocysts of Isospora, Cyclospora.
- 0.25–0.5% sulfuric acid alcohol for bacterial endospores.
- Differential staining – glacial acetic acid used, no heat applied, secondary stain is Loeffler's methylene blue.
- Kinyoun modification (or cold Ziehl–Neelsen technique) is also available.
- A protocol in which a detergent is substituted for the highly toxic phenol in the fuchsin staining solution.

== See also ==
- Lowenstein–Jensen medium
- Gram stain
- Kinyoun stain
- Acid-fastness
- Franz Ziehl
- Friedrich Neelsen

== Bibliography ==
- "Microbiology with Diseases by Body System", Robert W. Bauman, 2009, Pearson Education, Inc.
