= Auramine phenol stain =

Stain used to identify tuberculosis mycobacteria

Auramine phenol stain is a stain used in clinical microbiology and histology to identify tuberculosis mycobacteria.

There are two types of auramine phenol stains, 1 and 2 to stain mycobacterium species and cryptosporidium respectively. Both are fluorescent stains. The bacteria or the parasites appear brilliant greenish yellow against dark background. Mycolic acids of the mycobacteria keep this stain when decolorising with the acid alcohol. The method is more rapid and sensitive than ZN technique.

== Method ==
- Smears are prepared just like that for ZN staining
- Stain with Auramine-Phenol for 20 mins
- Rinse with water
- Decolourise in acid alcohol
- Rinse with water
- Counterstain with 0.1% potassium permanganate for 30 seconds
- Rinse and air dry
