= Acid-fastness =

Physical property of certain bacterial, protozoal, and eukaryotic cells

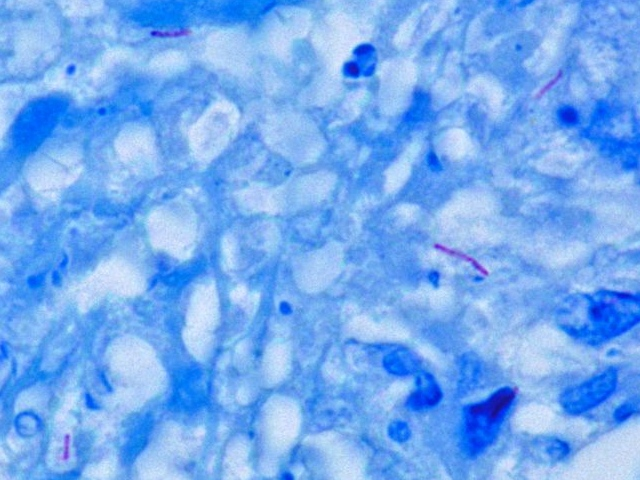
Mycobacterium tuberculosis (stained red) in tissue (blue).

Acid-fastness is a physical property of certain bacteria, protozoa, and eukaryotic cells, as well as some subcellular structures, referring to their resistance to decolorization by acids during laboratory staining procedures. Once stained as part of a sample, these organisms can resist the acid and/or ethanol-based decolorization procedures common in many staining protocols, hence the name acid-fast.

Historically, acid-fast stains were thought to stain lipids of the cells based on the observed characteristics of cell staining under a wide range of conditions, although the results were limited by the tools available, however as early as 1959 there were observations of how nucleic acids were acid fast. Dyes such as carbol fuchsin and auramine O penetrate the cell and bind to DNA and RNA, producing characteristic red or yellow-green fluorescence, respectively. The property of “acid-fastness” therefore reflects the organism’s ability to retain these dyes after acid–alcohol decolorization, a feature determined mainly by the integrity and composition of the outer cell wall rather than by any specific lipid chemistry.

The mechanisms of acid-fastness vary by species. In the genus Mycobacterium, the property has been traditionally attributed to the high mycolic acid content of the cell wall, which indeed contributes to dye retention and resistance to decolorization. However, many other acid-fast organisms—such as intestinal coccidia and parasitic helminths of the genus Schistosoma—lack mycolic acids yet display comparable acid-fastness, suggesting that other cell-wall structures, such as cyst walls or egg shells, may provide similar resistance to decolorization.

Further histopathologic evidence supports this broader mechanism: in tissue sections, staining intensity is markedly reduced when bacterial cell walls are damaged or when xylene-based deparaffinization is used during specimen processing. A xylene-free, heat-based method has been shown to preserve cell-wall integrity and substantially improve detection of mycobacteria and other acid-fast organisms, particularly when using fluorescent Auramine O staining.

Acid-fast organisms are difficult to characterize using standard microbiological techniques, though they can be stained using concentrated dyes, particularly when the staining process is combined with heat. Some, such as Mycobacteria, can be stained with the Gram stain, but they do not take the crystal violet well and thus appear light purple, which can still potentially result in an incorrect gram-negative identification.

The most common staining technique used to identify acid-fast bacteria is the Ziehl–Neelsen stain, in which acid-fast species appear bright red against a blue background. Another method is the Kinyoun method, in which bacteria appear red against a green background. Fluorescence microscopy using auramine O—a nucleic acid–binding fluorochrome—has largely replaced these techniques in clinical laboratories due to higher sensitivity, rapidity, and safety. Rhodamine, sometimes added as a secondary dye, contributes little to sensitivity but slightly enhances contrast.

== Some acid-fast staining techniques ==
- Ziehl–Neelsen stain (classic and modified bleach types)
- Kinyoun stain, a development of ZN that requires no heating; variants:
  - Alternative dyes (Victoria blue instead of fuchsin, picric acid instead of methylene blue), which is useful to color-blind people and materials where the classical ZN/Kinyoun dyes provide insufficient legibility.
  - Moeller's method
  - Dorner's method (acid alcohol decolorizer) without the Schaeffer–Fulton modification (decolorize by water)
  - Detergent method, using Tergitol 7, nonionic polyglycol ether surfactants type NP-7 for decolorizing
- Fite stain
  - Fite-Faraco stain
  - Wade Fite stain
- Ellis and Zabrowarny stain (no phenol/carbolic acid)
- Auramine-rhodamine stain
- Auramine phenol stain

== Notable acid-fast structures ==
Very few structures are acid-fast; this makes staining for acid-fastness particularly useful in diagnosis. The following are notable examples of structures which are acid-fast or modified acid-fast:

- All Mycobacteria – M. tuberculosis, M. leprae, M. smegmatis and atypical mycobacteria.
- Certain Actinobacteria (especially aerobic ones in the order Mycobacteriales) with mycolic acid in their cell wall; not to be confused with Actinomyces, which is a non-acid-fast genus of actinomycete. Note that Streptomyces do not contain mycolic acid.
  - Nocardia (weakly acid-fast; resists decolorization with weaker acid concentrations)
  - Rhodococcus
  - Gordonia
  - Tsukamurella
  - Dietzia
- Head of sperm
- Bacterial spores, see Endospore
- Legionella micdadei
- Certain cellular inclusions e.g.
  - Cytoplasmic inclusion bodies seen in
    - Neurons in layer 5 of cerebral cortex neuronal ceroid lipofuscinosis (Batten disease).
  - Nuclear inclusion bodies seen in
    - Lead poisoning
    - Bismuth poisoning.
- Oocysts of some coccidian parasites in faecal matter, such as:
  - Cryptosporidium parvum,
  - Isospora belli
  - Cyclospora cayetanensis.
- A few other parasites:
  - Sarcocystis
  - Taenia saginata eggs stain well but Taenia solium eggs don't (can be used to distinguish)
  - Hydatid cysts, especially their "hooklets" stain irregularly with ZN stain but emanate bright red fluorescence under green light, and can aid detection in moderately heavy backgrounds or with scarce hooklets.
- Fungal yeast forms are inconsistently stained with Acid-fast stain which is considered a narrow spectrum stain for fungi. In a study on acid-fastness of fungi, 60% of blastomyces and 47% of histoplasma showed positive cytoplasmic staining of the yeast-like cells, and Cryptococcus or candida did not stain, and very rare staining was seen in Coccidioides endospores.
