= Carbol fuchsin =

Staining chemical

- Chemical structure of fuchsin

Names
- IUPAC name 4-[(E)-(4-aminophenyl)-(4-imino-3-methylcyclohexa-2,5-dien-1-ylidene)methyl]-2-methylaniline;hydrochloride
- Other names Carbol-Fuchsin

Identifiers
CAS Number	8052-17-3; 4197-24-4
3D model (JSmol)	Interactive image
ChEBI	CHEBI:87668
ChemSpider	35787829
ECHA InfoCard	100.021.897
EC Number	224-086-6
PubChem CID	5748567
CompTox Dashboard (EPA)	DTXSID30962122
- InChI: InChI=1S/C21H21N3.ClH/c1-13-11-16(5-9-19(13)23)21(15-3-7-18(22)8-4-15)17-6-10-20(24)14(2)12-17;/h3-12,23H,22,24H2,1-2H3;1H/b21-16+,23-19?; Key: HZLHRDBTVSZCBS-UVJJDBRNSA-N
- SMILES: CC1=C/C(=C(\C2=CC=C(C=C2)N)/C3=CC(=C(C=C3)N)C)/C=CC1=N.Cl

Properties
Chemical formula	C_{20}H_{19}N_{3}O·HCl
Molar mass	337.85 g/mol

Hazards
- GHS labelling
Pictograms	(GHS07: Exclamation mark) (GHS08: Health hazard)
Signal word	Warning
- Except where otherwise noted, data are given for materials in their standard state (at 25 °C [77 °F], 100 kPa). Infobox references

Carbol fuchsin, carbol-fuchsin, carbolfuchsin, or Castellani's paint is a mixture of phenol and basic fuchsin that is used in bacterial staining procedures. It is commonly used in the staining of mycobacteria because it has an affinity for the mycolic acids found in their cell membranes.

It is a component of Ziehl–Neelsen stain, a differential stain. Carbol fuchsin is used as the primary stain dye to detect acid-fast bacteria because it is more soluble in the cells' wall lipids than in the acid alcohol. If the bacteria is acid-fast the bacteria will retain the initial red color of the dye because they are able to resist the destaining by acid alcohol (0.4–1% HCl in 70% EtOH). Additionally, it can be used for the staining of bacterial spores.

Carbol-fuchsin is also used as a topical antiseptic and antifungal.
