= Rafael Lucio Nájera =

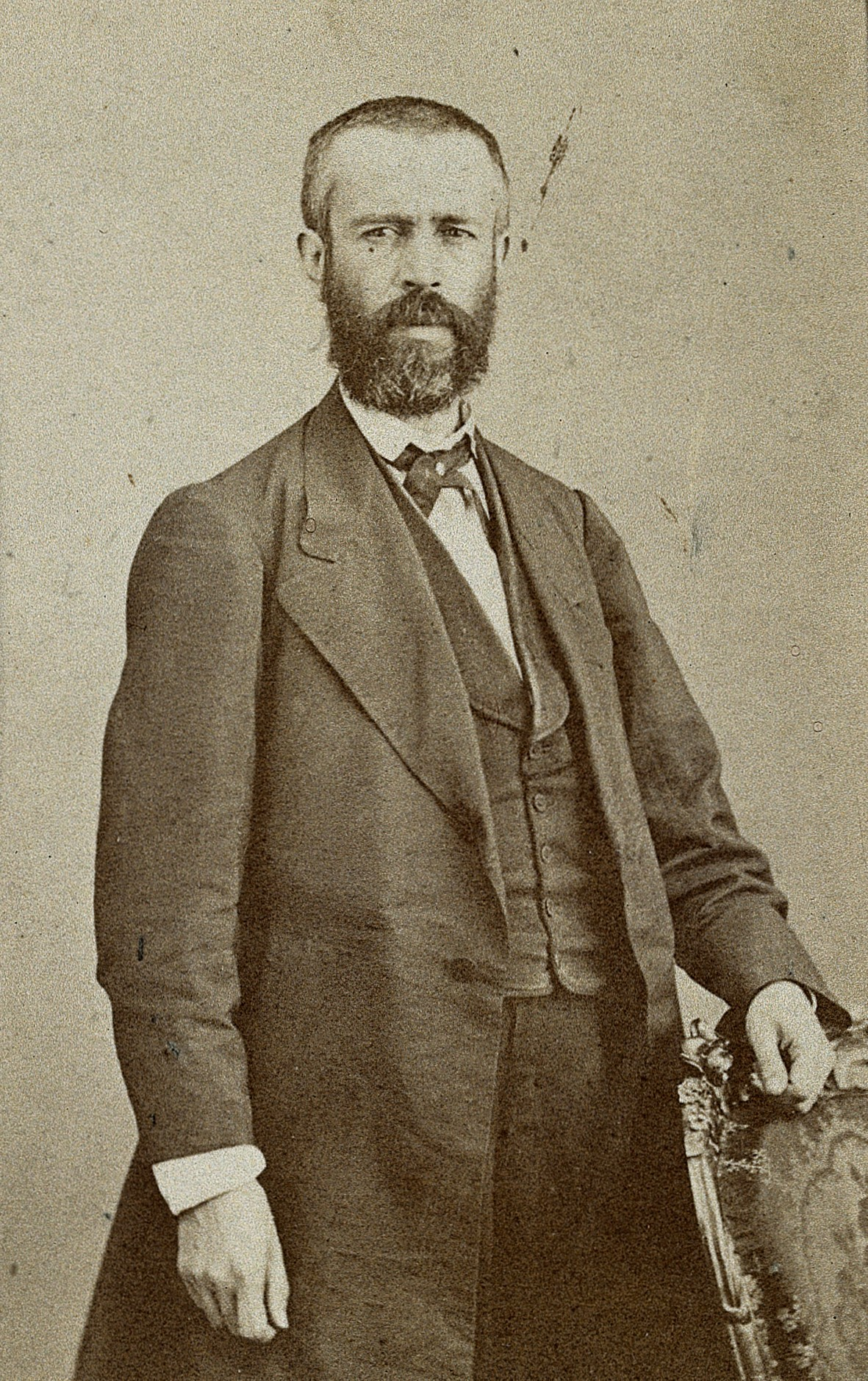
- Rafael Lucio Nájera

Personal details
- Born: 2 September 1819 Xalapa, Veracruz Mexico
- Died: 30 May 1886 (66 years old) Mexico City Mexico
- Profession: Medical and Scientific
- Known for: Investigating leprosy

Rafael Lucio Nájera (September 2, 1819 – May 30, 1886) was a Mexican medical doctor, academic and scientist born in Xalapa-Enríquez, Veracruz, who devoted many years of his life to research leprosy.

== Biography ==
=== Early years ===
Nájera's parents were Vicente Lucio, a Spanish merchant based in Mexico, and Gertrudis Nájera, a woman from a middle-class family from Veracruz.

Rafael Lucio lost his father at an early age. He began his studies in Xalapa, and later, when his mother remarried to a doctor, Manuel Salas, the family moved to the city of San Luis Potosi. There, he continued his schooling and his vocation for medicine began.

=== Studies ===
In 1838, he enrolled in the Establishment of Medical Sciences, in Mexico City, where he obtained a position in practical exercises of operative medicine. He completed his educational career with notable success, and in 1842, he earned his medical degree, having passed his examination brilliantly. Months later, when the young doctor was just twenty-four, he was appointed Director of the San Lazaro Hospital in the capital of the Republic, a position he held for seventeen years with great dedication, efficiency and humanitarianism.

=== Medical and scientific ===
During his tenure at the San Lazaro Hospital, he dedicated himself to the study and research of a disease that was very common among patients attending the institution; this illness was known back then as Saint Lazarus illness, or elephantiasis of the Greeks (leprosy). The disease first manifested symptoms such as inflamed reddish spots on the skin, later changing to a red wine color, and finally becoming ulcerations. Dr. Rafael Lucio gave this illness the name spotted Leprosy.

In 1845, Dr. Lucio was appointed assistant professor in the Faculty of Medicine and two years later, he was given the chair of legal medicine, however he stayed there only briefly since he quickly acquired the chair of internal pathology. In 1851, he reported his observations and research on this disease to the National Academy of Medicine.

His work was so clear and comprehensive that it formed the basis and motivation for other notable physicians, such as Fernando Latapí and Jean Charles Faget, who continued to research a cure for this terrible disease, a goal that was achieved in the early 1940s. In recognition for Dr. Rafael Lucio's valuable contributions the disease was named Diffuse leprosy of Lucio and Latapí.

Throughout his life, this man of science devoted himself to the study of medicine. In 1855 and 1868, he traveled to Europe to study the progress of medical science in those countries. Upon his return from both journeys, he implemented and shared what he had learned, especially in surgery and everything related to it. The reforms he introduced in this area represented a significant advance in medical practice in Mexico.

In October 1870, he made medical visits for several weeks to the National Palace, and collaborated with other physicians who were taking care of the President Benito Juarez.Years later, on July 18, 1872, he went with Gabino Barreda to see the president on his deathbed, although there was little they could do. That same day, Rafael Lucio, Gabino Barreda and Ignacio Alvarado declared President Juárez dead and signed his death certificate.

His relationship with the Emperor Maximilian was very close. Najera treated him for the symptoms he was suffering from, and he earned the gratitude of the latter, as well as the decoration of the Grand Cross of the Order of Guadalupe.

Dr. Rafael Lucio was a long-time professor at the School of Medicine. In addition to his wisdom and vast experience, he showed an ease of expression and remarkable clarity in his classes; his unassuming manners, his kindness and his spotless morality must be added to this, all qualities that made him an exemplary teacher.

In his private practice, he was widely known for his altruism and his humanitarian behavior. He attended to all his patients with the same care and dedication, regardless of the social class to which they belonged, or whether or not they could afford to pay his fees. Among his colleagues, he enjoyed great prestige and recognition. They often wanted to know his opinion on difficult cases, and he always gave a wise and generous response. Dr. Rafael Lucio was truly devoted to his profession of medical service, giving aid and comfort to anyone who needed it, and in response people gave their love and respect.

Among his colleagues, Dr. Rafael Lucio was recognized for his medical expertise and professional experience. He was frequently consulted on complex medical cases and contributed his knowledge to their assessment. Throughout his career, he provided medical assistance to people in need, establishing a professional reputation through his work and service.

=== Death ===
On May 30, 1886, Dr. Rafael Lucio Nájera died at age 66, in Mexico City and his body was buried in the Tepeyac Pantheon, where they laid his remains alongside those of his wife.

In recognition of his high virtues as a man and citizen, and his outstanding work as a physician and scientist, a statue of him was erected in the Paseo de la Reforma in Mexico City. Decades later, one of the streets in Colonia Doctores was named after him.

In order to honor the memory of such a meritorious Xalapan, the people of Veracruz named one of the main streets of his hometown, a colony of the city, a neighboring municipality and its county seat, formerly called San Miguel Soldier, after him.

== National Academy of Medicine of Mexico ==
Rafael Nájera, together with the other distinguished gentlemen Miguel F. Jiménez, Gabino Barreda, Eduardo Liceaga, Joseph Terrés, Manuel Martínez Baez, and Gustavo Baz, founded the National Academy of Medicine of Mexico in 1864, and they also managed to establish large medical institutions in the country. Nájera was also president of this institution in 1869 and 1880.

== Works ==
- 'The Booklet on St Lazarus illness or elephantiasis of the Greeks' (1851) Written in collaboration with Dr. Ignacio Alvarado, they describe how spotted Leprosy was undetected by previous authors. This form of leprosy later became known as "diffuse leprosy of Lucio and Latapi".
- 'Brief History of Mexican painting in the seventeenth and eighteenth centuries' (1864) Published in Mexico in 1864. There is a later edition in 1889.

== See also ==
- Mycobacterium lepromatosis
