= Lucio's phenomenon =

Lucio's phenomenon is an unusual reaction seen almost exclusively in patients from the Caribbean and Mexico with diffuse lepromatous leprosy, especially in untreated cases. It is characterised by recurrent crops of large, sharply demarcated, ulcerative lesions, affecting mainly the lower extremities, but may generalise and become fatal as a result of secondary bacterial infection and sepsis.

Lucio's phenomenon was first described by Rafael Lucio Nájera and Alvarado as a necrotizing skin reaction associated with non-nodular diffuse leprosy in 1852. This reaction was later named by Latapi and Zamora in 1948 as Lucio's phenomenon after identification of histopathological changes involving multiple, acute and necrotizing cutaneous vasculitis peculiar to pure and primitive diffuse leprosy (PPDL).

== Pathogenesis ==
The mechanism of pathogenesis is thought to be mediated by immune-complex deposition.

== Morphology ==
Histologically, the lesions are characterised by ischemic necrosis of the epidermis and superficial dermis, heavy infestation of endothelial cells with acid-fast bacilli, and endothelial proliferation and thrombosis in the larger vessels of the deeper dermis.

== Treatment ==
Lucio's phenomenon is treated by anti-leprosy therapy (dapsone, rifampin, and clofazimine), optimal wound care, and treatment for bacteremia, including antibiotics. In severe cases, exchange transfusion is helpful. Treatment may also include systemic glucocorticoids, and anticoagulation therapy. Following treatment, patients' fever and dyspnea may resolve within several weeks, and after several months of wound care, the skin lesions should heal, although atrophic and retracted scars are likely to remain.

== Epidemiology ==
Lucio's phenomenon is seen mainly in the Caribbean and Mexico, and rare in other parts of the world. Genetic and regional factors and factors specific to M. leprae have been shown to alter the manifestation of Lucio's phenomenon.

== Eponym ==
It is named after Rafael Lucio Nájera (1819 – 1886), a Mexican physician who (together with his medical assistant, Alvarado) described and observed it in one of his patients in 1852. He himself got infected with this type of Leprosy from which he died in 1886, aged 66 years.
