= Histoid leprosy =

- Specialty: Dermatology

Histoid leprosy is a skin condition, a rare form of multibacillary leprosy. It can occur in those with relapsing leprosy after undergoing antibiotic therapy with dapsone, or less frequently in the first infection (termed de novo).

Leprosy can appear in two forms, tuberculoid leprosy and lepromatous leprosy, and histoid leprosy is a variant of lepromatous leprosy. It appears as "cutaneous and/or subcutaneous nodules and papules, which are painless, succulent, discrete, smooth, globular, skin-colored to yellowish-brown, with apparently normal skin surrounding it." In India, histoid leprosy is estimated to compose 2.79%-3.6% of all leprosy cases. The male to female ratio in most parts of the world is 2:1. It is treated with antimycobacterial chemotherapy and multibacillary multidrug therapy.

== See also ==
- Skin lesion
