= Heráclides César de Souza Araújo =

Brazilian scientist

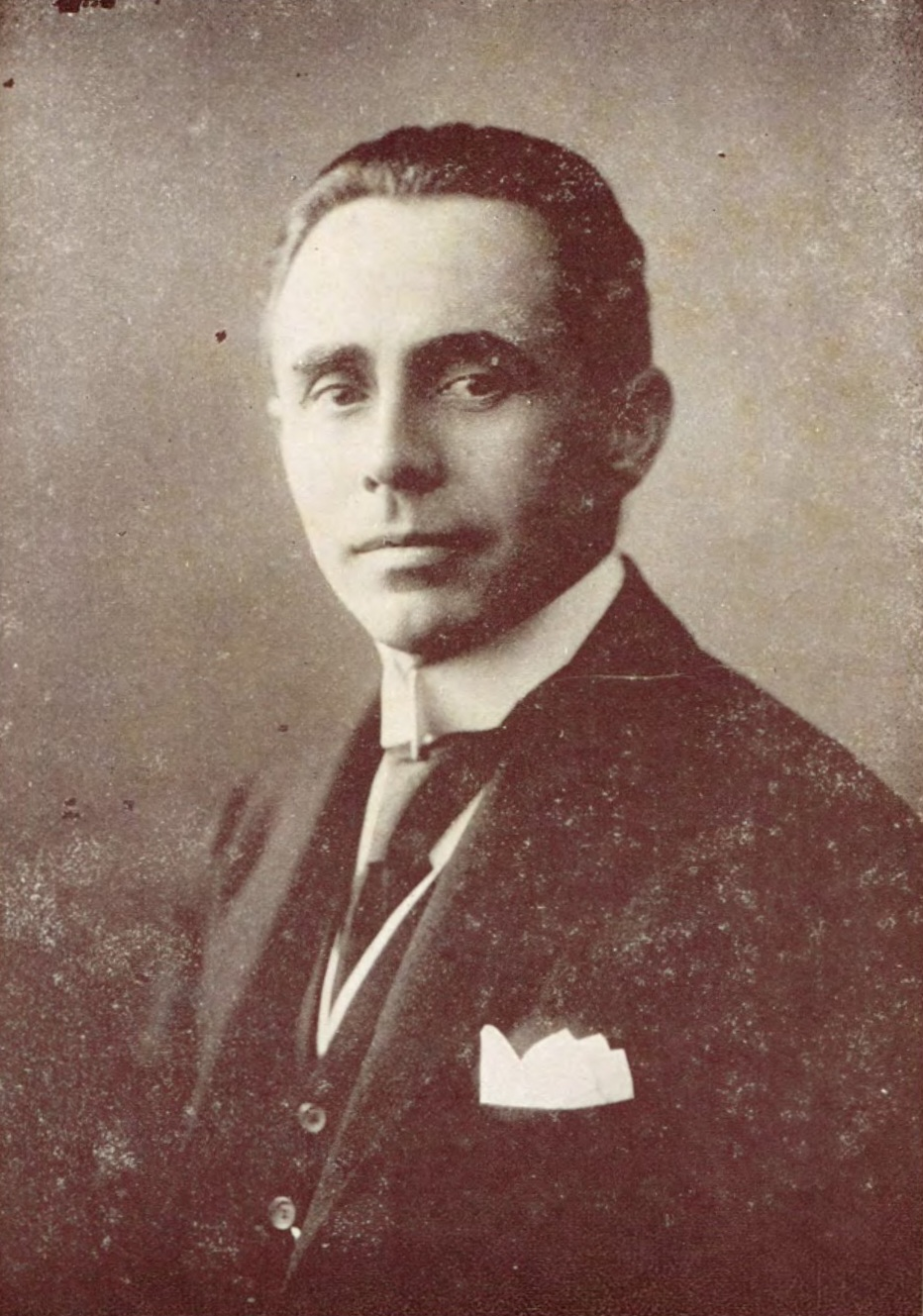
Portrait of Souza Araújo (1924)

Heráclides César de Souza Araújo (24 June 1886 – 10 August 1962) was a Brazilian scientist known for his research into the control and treatment of leprosy. He served on the World Health Organization (WHO) Expert Committee on Leprosy and on the council of the International Leprosy Association, and received national honours in recognition of his work.

== Early life ==
Souza Araújo was born in Imbituva, Paraná, Brazil, in 1886. He graduated from the Escola de Farmácia de Ouro Preto in Minas Gerais and enrolled immediately at the Faculdade de Medicina de Rio de Janeiro, finishing there in 1915. While still a student, he also completed the Curso de Applicação offered by the Instituto Oswaldo Cruz (IOC) in 1913. He received his doctorate from IOC, with his thesis entitled Estudo sobre o granuloma venéreo(english:A study of venereal granuloma). His training concluded with the courses in Public Health at Johns Hopkins University in the US in 1926, and in Dermatology at the London School of Dermatology between 1930 and 1931.

== Career ==
At the end of his internship Souza Araújo received an invitation by Affonso Camargo, the state president, to participate in sanitation of Paraná, his home state. In 1918, the Rural Prophilaxy Service was established and Souza Araujo would soon be called to head the subsection in Paraná.

After graduation Souza Araújo remained affiliated with the Instituto Oswaldo Cruz and began to concentrate on the area of leprology. During the 1920s he served as head of the Rural Sanitary Service of Pará, opening the Lazarópolis do Prata leprosarium on June 24, 1924. He later wrote a monograph on this leprosarium. During this time he also headed the newly created Institute for Prophylaxis and Venereal Diseases, paying special attention to the spread of syphilis due to prostitution.

As a researcher at IOC he published around 210 scientific works and headed the Leprology Laboratory from 1927 to 1956. He also edited the journal Memórias do Instituto Oswaldo Cruz during the same period. He was head of the Bacteriology Section and of the Division of Microbiology and Immunology from 1946 to 1956, and professor of the application course from 1928 to 1956.

As an internationally renowned researcher Souza Araújo had an important role in the creation of the International Society of Leprology, holding the post of vice-president from 1932 to 1956.

He dedicated himself to research into the control and treatment of leprosy, and played an important role both as a formulator of policy and as a critic of the policies and public initiatives in the field. He visited the main institutions involved in the study of and fight against the disease, both in Brazil and abroad. He was nominated Knight-Commander of the Military and Hospital Order of St. Lazarus of Jerusalem in 1936 and was a member of the WHO Expert Committee on Leprosy.

Despite retiring in 1956, Souza Araújo continued working at the IOC until his death in 1962.

He was a Councillor of the International Leprosy Association and patron of the Center for the Study of Leprosy of the Federal University of Parana, to which he donated his personal collection of books on leprosy.

== Awards ==
In 1960 the Brazilian government awarded him the Order of Medical Merit in recognition of his outstanding work.

== Publications ==
- A História da Lepra no Brasil: Volume I, 1946. Imprensa Nacional, Rio de Janeiro.
- A História da Lepra no Brasil: Volume II, 1948. Imprensa Nacional, Rio de Janeiro.
- A História da Lepra no Brasil: Volume III. Imprensa Nacional, Rio de Janeiro.
- A Lepra em 40 Países, 1929. Instituto Oswaldo Cruz, Rio de Janeiro.
- Lazaropolis do Prata. A primeira colonia agricola de leprosos fundada no Brasil. Monograph. Belem, 1924.
- 'Contribuição á epidemiologia e prophylaxia da lepra no norte do Brasil'. Mem. Inst. Osw. Cruz, 1933:27 (3)
- 'A lepra e as organizações anti-leprosas do Brasil em 1936: 2.- Estado do Pará - Organizações anti-leprosas: Lazaropolis do Prata'. Mem. Inst. Osw. Cruz, 1937:32 (1)
- 'The Leprosy Problem in Brazil'. The American Journal of Tropical Medicine, 1925:5 (3)
