= Lepromatous leprosy =

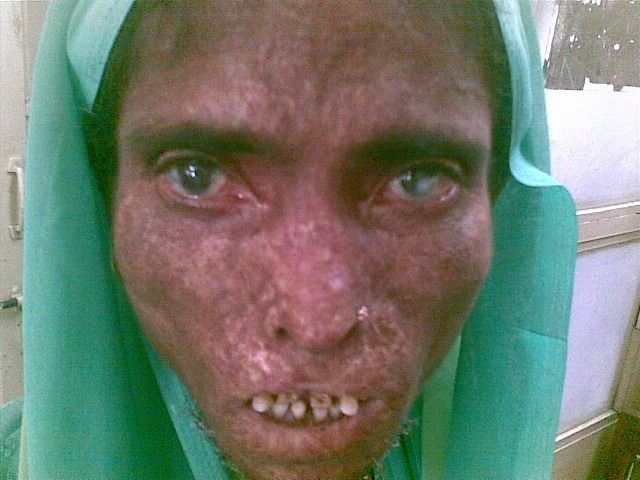
- Leonine facies in lepromatous
- Specialty: Infectious diseases

Lepromatous leprosy is a form of leprosy characterized by pale macules in the skin.

It results from the failure of Th1 cell activation which is necessary to eradicate the mycobacteria (Th1 response is required to activate macrophages that engulf and contain the disease). In lepromatous leprosy, TH2 response is turned on, and because of reciprocal inhibition (IL-4; IL-10), the cell-mediated response (TH1) is depressed. Lepromatous leprosy, in contrast to the tuberculoid form of leprosy, is characterized by the absence of epithelioid cells in the lesions. In this form of leprosy Mycobacterium leprae are found in lesion in large numbers. This is the most unfavorable clinical variant of leprosy.

This debilitating form of leprosy begins to spread causing the eyebrows to disappear and spongy tumor like swellings appear on the face and body. The disease attacks the internal organs, bones, joints and marrow of the body resulting in physical degeneration. The result is deformity with loss of feeling in the fingers and toes which eventually fall off. Contrary to popular belief, both forms of leprosy are curable, with the lepromatous form classically treated with antibiotics dapsone, rifampin and clofazimine for as long as 2–5 years, but if left untreated the person may die up to 20 or 30 years from its inception.

Early detection of the disease is of utmost importance, since severe physical and neurological damage are irreversible even if cured (e.g. blindness, loss of digits/limbs/sensation). Early infection is characterized by a well demarcated, usually pale, skin lesion which has lost its hair, and there may be many of these lesions if the infection is more severe (most commonly found on the cooler parts of the body such as the elbows, knees, fingers, or scrotum, as the bacteria thrive in cooler environments). This early presentation is the same for both tuberculous and lepromatous forms of leprosy as they are a spectrum of the same disease (lepromatous being the more contagious and severe form in patients with impaired Th1 response). Disease progression is extremely slow, and signs of infection may not appear for years.

Family members of those with the disease, and especially children, are most at risk. The disease is believed to be spread through respiratory droplets in close quarters like its relative Mycobacterium tuberculosis, and similarly requires extended exposure to an individual in most situations, so outsiders and healthcare workers are normally not infected (except with the most infective individuals such as those in the most progressed lepromatous forms, as those patients have the highest bacterial loads).

== See also ==
- Tuberculoid leprosy
- Diffuse leprosy of Lucio and Latapí
