= Peter Greave =

English writer (1910–1977)

- Born: Gerald Peter Wilkinson; 29 October 1910; Calcutta, India
- Died: 1 November 1977 (aged 67); East Hanningfield, Essex, England
- Other name: Gerald Carberry
- Occupation: Writer
- Spouse: Violet Philippa Wood
- Parent(s): Herbert Reginald Wilkinson, Katherine Margaret Tighe

Peter Greave (29 October 1910 – 1 November 1977) was an English writer.

== Personal life ==
Peter Greave was born Gerald Peter Wilkinson on 29 October 1910 in Calcutta. His father, Herbert Reginald Wilkinson, was a former British Army soldier working for Doyle & Company and his mother the daughter of a former Assistant Police Commissioner of Bombay.

Gerald Wilkinson's childhood was marked by a series of crises created by his father Herbert, who was both a swindler and a compulsive exhibitionist. In 1918, fleeing bankruptcy, Herbert took the family to New York City. The family returned to India in 1922 after a series of failed ventures, including an attempt to introduce the Dixie Flyer automobile to South Africa. In 1925, his father, now calling himself Herbert Carberry, was jailed in Bombay for organizing a bogus lottery scheme. His mother died of cancer in 1927 and Gerald, his brother Michael, and his sister Mary were sent to separate orphanages.

Gerald worked in a variety of jobs, usually involving traveling around India as a salesman, after leaving school. "I lived like a nomad, moving from one city to another, existing in seedy hotels or in shoddy rooms where I seldom remained for more than a few weeks at a time", he later wrote in The Seventh Gate. His father reappeared after further failures in Burma and New Zealand and the two worked together briefly, forming a scrap dealership known as H. Greave.

In August 1939, Gerald was diagnosed with leprosy, also known as Hansen's disease. His health quickly deteriorated and he spent much of the next seven years living in squalid conditions in Calcutta, dependent upon the charity of his friends and occasional funds from his father. In 1947, he was brought to England by the British Empire Leprosy Relief Association and transported to the Homes of St Giles for British Lepers in East Hanningfield, Essex. Although his leprosy was cured, his physical health and eyesight were permanently impaired. Aside from occasional trips, he would spend the rest of his life as a patient and resident here.

Soon after arriving at St Giles, he became involved with one of its nurses, Violet Philippa Wood, and the two were married in London in 1948. Gerald kept the marriage secret from most of the staff and residents of St Giles and did not mention it in his account of his first years there, The Second Miracle. Violet died in 1963.

He began publishing short articles and reviews in the early 1950s. His decision to publish under the pseudonym of Peter Greave was, in part, intended to avoid possible expulsion from St Giles. The Second Miracle was published by Chatto & Windus in 1955. Reviewing the book for The Tatler and Bystander, Elizabeth Bowen called it "a self-told and deeply moving story: a leper in England, and his cure". She also praised its honesty: "For instance, nobody is idealized — the fellow-patients, the doctors, the nuns in the distance, the eager but often slapdash young novices are shown to be much as humans are". The book was also published by Henry Holt and Company in the United States.

He then followed with two novels loosely based on his experiences in India prior to the onset of his leprosy: Young Man in the Sun in 1958 and The Painted Leopard in 1960. The Times of India's reviewer wrote of the first book, "This is a rare novel: one in which humor is distilled to the last bitter drop.... Whatever he may or may not have learnt about commerce and love, Peter Greave certainly learnt a lot about life and he depicts the part of his education with a brilliance that makes one long for more from his pen".

By the early 1960s, his eyesight had begun to fail. Despite a series of operations, he lost his sight completely in early 1968 and had to write by dictating to one of the secretaries of St Giles. In 1967, he received a £600 bursary from Arts Council England, which he used in part to purchase a tape recorder for his dictations.

In 1976, Maurice Temple Smith published The Seventh Gate, a memoir of his life up to his final departure from India. Reviewing the book for The Times, Jeremy Lewis called it "one of the most vivid, humorous and movingly entertaining autobiographies I have read in years". In New Society, Tony Gould wrote that "The Seventh Gate is a marvellous book — joyous and enchanting. It is a celebration of life such as perhaps only someone who had been deprived of all that makes it worthwhile could compose".

He died at St Giles on 1 November 1977.

== Works ==
Memoirs

- The Second Miracle (1955)
- The Seventh Gate (1976)

Novels

- Young Man in the Sun (1958)
- The Painted Leopard (1960)
