= Mycobacterium lepromatosis =

Scientific classification
- Domain: Bacteria
- Kingdom: Bacillati
- Phylum: Actinomycetota
- Class: Actinomycetes
- Order: Mycobacteriales
- Family: Mycobacteriaceae
- Genus: Mycobacterium
- Species: M. lepromatosis

Binomial name
- Mycobacterium lepromatosis Han et al. 2008

Species of bacterium

Mycobacterium lepromatosis is an aerobic, acid-fast bacillus (AFB), and the second known causative agent of Hansen's disease (leprosy). It was discovered in 2008. Analysis of the 16S rRNA gene confirms that the species is distinct from Mycobacterium leprae.

== Characteristics ==
Members of the Mycobacterium genus are characterized by being Gram-positive, non-motile, non-spore-forming, and possessing a bacilliary cell shape. Bacteria in the Mycobacterium genus are characteristically known for possessing an outer membrane, a capsule, as well as a uniquely thick, waxy, hydrophobic cell wall abundant in mycolic acids. Many species of Mycobacterium are opportunistic pathogenic bacteria and can cause serious disease.

The 16S ribosomal RNA (rRNA), a genetic marker of bacterial evolution, is used in establishing phylogenetic relationships due to its highly conserved nature. 16S rRNA sequencing of M. lepromatosis displays a 2% genomic discrepancy from M. leprae, with M. haemophilum as an outgroup. An alignment of five protein-coding genes, including rpoB, was also analyzed, displaying speciation from two relatives, M. leprae and M. tuberculosis. M. lepromatosis exemplifies a 9.1% deviance from M. leprae in nucleotide structure, evidence of a novel bacterium. A phylogenetic analysis of 20 genes and pseudogenes, isolated to five conserved protein genes, was used to construct phylogenetic trees displaying long terminal branches from the nodes, suggesting speciation occurred long ago.

== Disease ==
Mycobacterium lepromatosis can induce diffuse lepromatous leprosy (DLL), typically known to occur in Mexico and the Caribbean. DLL is a severe form of leprosy that manifests through nerve invasion and extensive skin ulcerations due to massive AFB burden in internal organs. M. lepromatosis, like M. leprae, has not been cultured in the laboratory because it lacks genes necessary to grow outside its hosts. These genes are believed to have been lost through reductive evolution.

The novel bacterium was discovered in 2008 following the autopsy of two deceased patients from Mexico. Similar to M. leprae, M. lepromatosis is an obligate intracellular parasite that reproduces only in host cells, a fact that researchers have speculated explains why its culturing in the laboratory has been unsuccessful. Visually indistinguishable from its close relative, M. lepromatosis is an aerobic bacillus, requiring an oxygenated environment, is rod-shaped, consistent with all bacillus bacteria, and is resistant to acids due to the presence of mycolic acids in the cell wall. This prohibits the standard use of the Gram stain in characterization.
