= Josephine Cafrine =

Seychellois diarist (1877–1907)

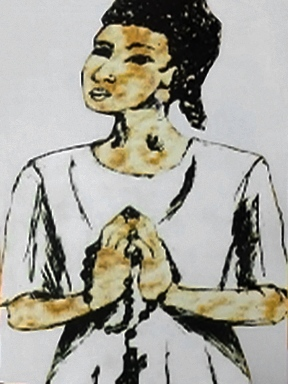
- Born: 13 June 1877; Anse Royale, Mahé
- Died: 14 January 1907 (aged 29); Anse Royale, Mahé
- Known for: Leprosy sufferer, writer

Theresa Josephine Cafrine (13 June 1877 – 14 January 1907) was a woman from Seychelles, known for writing about her suffering from leprosy. Her wounds were said to have miraculously healed upon her death. The journal that she kept documenting her life with leprosy was published as an autobiography after her death. Cafrine was inducted into the Seychelles Women's Hall of Fame in 2012 and a committee from the Roman Catholic Diocese of Port Victoria is gathering evidence for a potential beatification.

== Life ==
Theresa Josephine Cafrine was born on 13 June 1877 at Anse Royale, Mahé where she spent the rest of her life. Cafrine later became an orphan and was a devout Roman Catholic. She suffered from leprosy from the age of 12 and kept a personal journal that documented her struggles and suffering. The disease later progressed such that she could no longer hold her pencil to write and the journal was continued by dictation to Father Philibert, a Catholic priest from Anse Royale. Cafrine died on 14 January 1907. After her death her wounds and scars, resulting from the disease, were said to have been miraculously cured.

A Belgian priest, Father Vital, came to Cafrine's house after the death of Father Philibert, found her journal and arranged for it to be published as an autobiography in Belgium in 1923. Soon after this there were calls for her beatification by the church.

In 2012 Cafrine was amongst the first group of women to be inducted to the Seychelles Women's Hall of Fame. A series of events were held in 2016 to commemorate the 109th anniversary of her death. This included an exhibition and the relaunch of her autobiography in English, French and Seychellois Creole translations. A commemorative service was held at the Immaculate Conception Cathedral, attended by the Minister for Tourism and Culture, Alain St Ange. A committee from the Roman Catholic Diocese of Port Victoria was formed in 2010 to collect information and accounts regarding possible miracles performed by Cafrine so that she can be considered for beatification.
