= WHO Expert Committee on Leprosy =

WHO Expert Committee on Leprosy is constituted by World Health Organization to study the worldwide progress of leprosy.

== Members ==
At one point it held among its members Heráclides César de Souza Araújo, a leprosy researcher from Brasil.

== Reports ==
- First report published as Technical Report Series No. 71 in 1954.
- Second report published as Technical Report Series No. 189 in 1960.
- Third report published as Technical Report Series No. 319 in 1966.
- Fourth report published as Technical Report Series No. 459 in 1970.
- Fifth report published as Technical Report Series No. 607 in 1977.
- Sixth report published as Technical Report Series No. 768 in 1988.
- Seventh report published as Technical Report Series No. 874 in 1998. They concluded that a single dose of a combination of rifampicin, ofloxacin and minocycline is an acceptable and cost-effective alternative regimen for the treatment of single-lesion paucibacillary leprosy and the duration of the standard regimen for multibacillary leprosy could be shortened to 12 months.
- Eighth report published as ISBN 978-92-4-120968-7 in 2012.
