= Leonine facies =

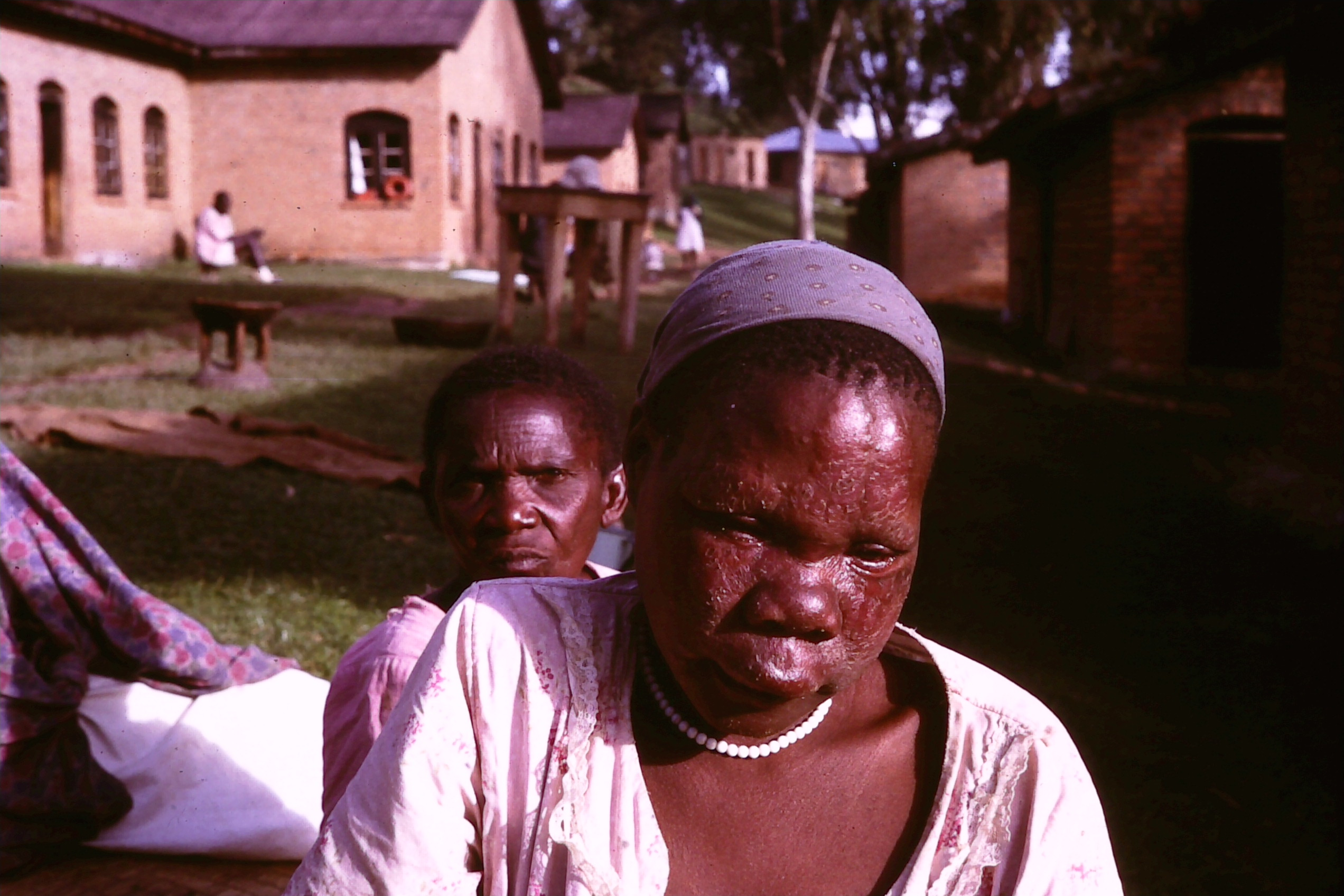
- Ugandan woman with leprosy exhibiting leonine facies.
- Causes: Leprosy, Paget's disease of bone

Leonine facies is a facies that resembles that of a lion. It is seen in multiple conditions and has been classically described for lepromatous leprosy as well as Paget's disease of bone. It is a dermatological symptom, with characteristic facial features that are visible on presentation, and is useful for focusing on differential diagnosis.

== Associated conditions ==
Differential diagnoses include the following:

- Lepromatous leprosy
- Paget's disease of bone
- Mycosis fungoides
- Polyostotic fibrous dysplasia
- Amyloidosis
- Actinic reticuloid
- Cutaneous T cell lymphoma
- Leishmaniasis
- Lipoid proteinosis
- Progressive nodular histiocytosis
- Mastocytosis
- Hyperimmunoglobulin E syndrome, also known as Job's syndrome

== See also ==
- Facies
- Leontiasis ossea
