= PACRG =

Protein-coding gene in the species Homo sapiens

Identifiers
- Aliases: PACRG, GLUP, HAK005771, PARK2CRG, PARK2 co-regulated, PARK2 coregulated, parkin coregulated, PACRG2.1
- External IDs: OMIM: 608427; MGI: 1916560; GeneCards: PACRG

Gene location (Human)
Chr.	Chromosome 6 (human)
Band	6q26	Start	162,727,132 bp
Band	6q26	End	163,315,500 bp

Gene location (Mouse)
Chr.	Chromosome 17 (mouse)
Band	17 A1|17 7.8 cM	Start	10,621,941 bp
Band	17 A1|17 7.8 cM	End	11,059,198 bp
RNA expression pattern
Bgee	Human / Mouse (ortholog); Top expressed in: bronchial epithelial cell; right uterine tube; olfactory zone of nasal mucosa; left testis; right testis; sperm; anterior pituitary; gonad; mucosa of paranasal sinus; apex of heart / Top expressed in: seminiferous tubule; facial motor nucleus; spermatid; olfactory epithelium; lumbar subsegment of spinal cord; spermatocyte; choroid plexus of fourth ventricle; secondary oocyte; anterior horn of spinal cord; Epithelium of choroid plexus; More reference expression data
BioGPS	n/a
Gene ontology
Molecular function	Hsp70 protein binding; Hsp90 protein binding; actin binding; alpha-tubulin binding; chaperone binding; G protein-coupled receptor binding; heat shock protein binding; ubiquitin protein ligase binding; beta-tubulin binding
Cellular component	cell body; vesicle; cytosol; neuron projection; sperm midpiece; cilium; mitochondrion; nucleus
Biological process	negative regulation of cell death; Unfolded protein response; spermatid development
Sources:Amigo / QuickGO
Orthologs
Databases	NCBI: entry; OMA: entry
Species	Human	Mouse
Entrez	135138	69310
Ensembl	ENSG00000112530	ENSMUSG00000037196
UniProt	Q96M98	Q9DAK2
RefSeq (mRNA)	NM_001080378; NM_001080379; NM_152410	NM_027032
RefSeq (protein)	NP_001073847; NP_001073848; NP_689623	NP_081308
Location (UCSC)	Chr 6: 162.73 – 163.32 Mb	Chr 17: 10.62 – 11.06 Mb
PubMed search
- Wikidata
View/Edit Human	View/Edit Mouse

Parkin coregulated gene protein is a protein that in humans is encoded by the PACRG gene.

This gene encodes a protein that is conserved across metazoans. In vertebrates, this gene is linked in a head-to-head arrangement with the adjacent parkin gene, which is associated with autosomal recessive juvenile Parkinson's disease. These genes are co-regulated in various tissues and they share a bi-directional promoter. Both genes are associated with susceptibility to leprosy. The parkin co-regulated gene protein forms a large molecular complex with chaperones, including heat shock proteins 70 and 90, and chaperonin components. This protein is also a component of Lewy bodies in Parkinson's disease patients, and it suppresses unfolded Pael receptor-induced neuronal cell death. Multiple transcript variants encoding different isoforms have been found for this gene.
