= Diffuse leprosy of Lucio and Latapí =

Clinical variety of lepromatous leprosy

The diffuse leprosy of Lucio and Latapí, also known as diffuse lepromatous leprosy or "pretty leprosy", is a clinical variety of lepromatous leprosy. It was first described by Lucio and Alvarado in 1852 and re-identified by Latapí in 1936. It is common in Mexico (23% of leprosy cases) and in Costa Rica and very rare in other countries.

== History ==
The spotted or lazarine leprosy was first described by Ladislao de la Pascua in 1844. Lucio and Alvarado published a description of the disease with the same names in 1852. Latapí re-described it in 1938 and reported it as 'spotted' leprosy of Lucio in 1948. It was named the diffuse leprosy of Lucio and Latapí in 1963 by Frenken.

The underlying pathology was explained by Chévez-Zamora as a diffuse generalised cutaneous infiltration. He named it pure and primitive diffuse lepromatosis, upon which necrotising lesions develop. He proposed the name Fenómeno de Lucio or erythema necrotisans for these lesions.

== Clinical features ==
This condition is characterized by:

- a diffuse infiltration of all the skin which never transforms into nodule
- a complete alopecia of eyebrows and eyelashes and body hair
- an anhydrotic and dysesthetic zones of the skin
- a peculiar type of lepra reaction named Lucio's phenomenon or necrotic erythema

Lucio's phenomenon consists of well-shaped erythematous spots which later become necrotic with scabs, ulcerations and scars. These lesions are usually located on the lower extremities and may be extensive. They are frequently painful and rarely fatal.

== Pathology ==
The main pathological features of this disease are a vasculitis affecting all cutaneous vessels.

There are by five characteristic features:

- colonisation of endothelial cells by acid-fast bacilli
- endothelial proliferation and marked thickening of vessel walls to the point of obliteration
- angiogenesis
- vascular ectasia
- thrombosis of the superficial and mid-dermal blood vessels

The likely pathogenesis is endothelial cell injury due to colonization/invasion followed by proliferation, angiogenesis, thrombosis and vessel ectasia.

== Treatment ==
Lucio's phenomenon is treated by anti-leprosy therapy (dapsone, rifampin, and clofazimine), optimal wound care, and treatment for bacteremia including antibiotics. In severe cases exchange transfusion may be helpful.
