= Leprosy =

Chronic disease caused by bacterial infection

- Other names: Hansen's disease (HD)
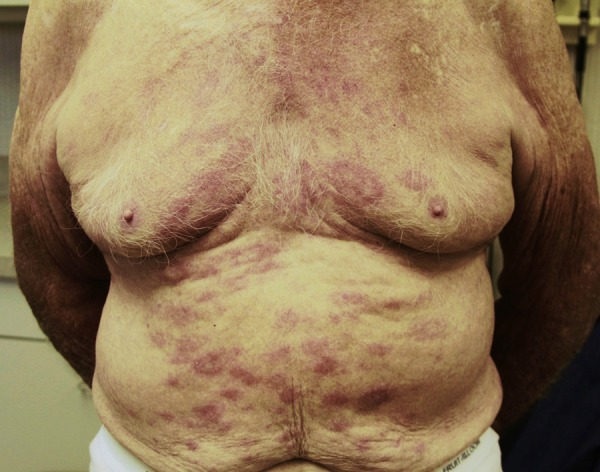
- Rash on the chest and abdomen caused by leprosy
- Pronunciation: /ˈlɛprəsi/
- Specialty: Infectious diseases
- Symptoms: Skin lesions, neuropathy, muscle weakness, partial paralysis, blindness, decreased ability to feel pain
- Causes: Mycobacterium leprae or Mycobacterium lepromatosis
- Risk factors: Close contact with a case of leprosy, living in poverty
- Treatment: Multidrug therapy
- Medication: Rifampicin, dapsone, clofazimine
- Frequency: 200,000 annually
- Named after: Gerhard Armauer Hansen

Leprosy, also known as Hansen's disease (HD), is a long-term infection by the bacterium Mycobacterium leprae or Mycobacterium lepromatosis. Infection can lead to damage of the nerves, respiratory tract, skin, and eyes. This nerve damage may result in the loss of nociception (the ability to feel physical pain), which can lead to the loss of parts of a person's extremities from repeated injuries or infection through unnoticed wounds. An infected person may also experience muscle weakness and loss of eyesight. Leprosy symptoms may begin within one year or take 20 years or more.

Leprosy is spread between people, although extensive contact is necessary. Leprosy has a low pathogenicity, and 95% of people who contract or who are exposed to M. leprae do not develop the disease. Spread is likely through a cough or contact with fluid from the nose of a person infected by leprosy. Genetic factors and baseline immune function play a role in how easily a person catches the disease. Leprosy is not spread during pregnancy to the unborn child or through sexual genital contact. There are two main types of the disease—paucibacillary and multibacillary, which differ in the number of bacteria present. A person with paucibacillary disease has five or fewer poorly pigmented, numb skin patches, while a person with multibacillary disease has more than five skin patches. The diagnosis is confirmed by finding acid-fast bacilli in a biopsy of the skin.

Leprosy is curable with multidrug therapy. Treatment of paucibacillary leprosy is with the medications dapsone, rifampicin, and clofazimine for six months. Treatment for multibacillary leprosy uses the same medications for 12 months. Several other antibiotics may also be used. These treatments are provided free of charge by the World Health Organization.

Leprosy is not highly contagious. People with leprosy can live with their families and attend school and work. In the 1980s, there were 5.2 million cases globally, but by 2020 this decreased to fewer than 200,000. Most new cases occur in one of 14 countries, with India accounting for more than half of all new cases. In the 20 years from 1994 to 2014, 16 million people worldwide were cured of leprosy. Separating people affected by leprosy by placing them in leper colonies is not supported by evidence but as of the late 2000s was still occurring in some areas of India, China, Japan, Africa, and Thailand.

Leprosy has affected humanity for thousands of years. The disease takes its name from the Greek word λέπρα (lépra), from λεπίς (lepís; 'scale'), while the term "Hansen's disease" is named after the Norwegian physician Gerhard Armauer Hansen. Leprosy has historically been associated with social stigma, which continues to be a barrier to self-reporting and early treatment. Leprosy is classified as a neglected tropical disease. World Leprosy Day was started in 1954 to draw awareness to those affected by leprosy. The study of leprosy and its treatment is known as leprology.

== Signs and symptoms ==
Common symptoms present in the different types of leprosy include a rhinorrhea; dry scalp; vision problems; skin lesions; muscle weakness; reddish skin; smooth, shiny, diffuse thickening of facial skin, ear, and hand tissues; loss of sensation in fingers and toes; thickening of peripheral nerves; a flat nose from the destruction of nasal cartilage; and changes in phonation and other aspects of speech production. In addition, atrophy of the testes and erectile dysfunction may occur.

Leprosy onset varies between individuals. The average incubation period is five years. The infected may begin to notice symptoms within the first year or up to 20 years after infection. Oftentimes, the first noticeable sign of leprosy is the development of pale or pink-coloured patches of skin that may be insensitive to temperature or pain. Patches of discolored skin are sometimes accompanied or preceded by nerve problems, including numbness or tenderness in the hands or feet. Secondary infections (bacterial or viral infections consequent to the primary infection) can result in tissue loss, causing fingers and toes to become shortened and deformed as cartilage is absorbed into the body. Baseline immune function drives at least some parts of pathogenesis variability.

Approximately 30% of individuals affected by leprosy experience nerve damage. The nerve damage sustained is reversible when treated early, but becomes permanent when appropriate treatment is delayed by several months. Damage to nerves may cause loss of muscle function, leading to paralysis. It may also lead to sensation abnormalities or numbness, leading to additional infections, ulcerations, and joint deformities.

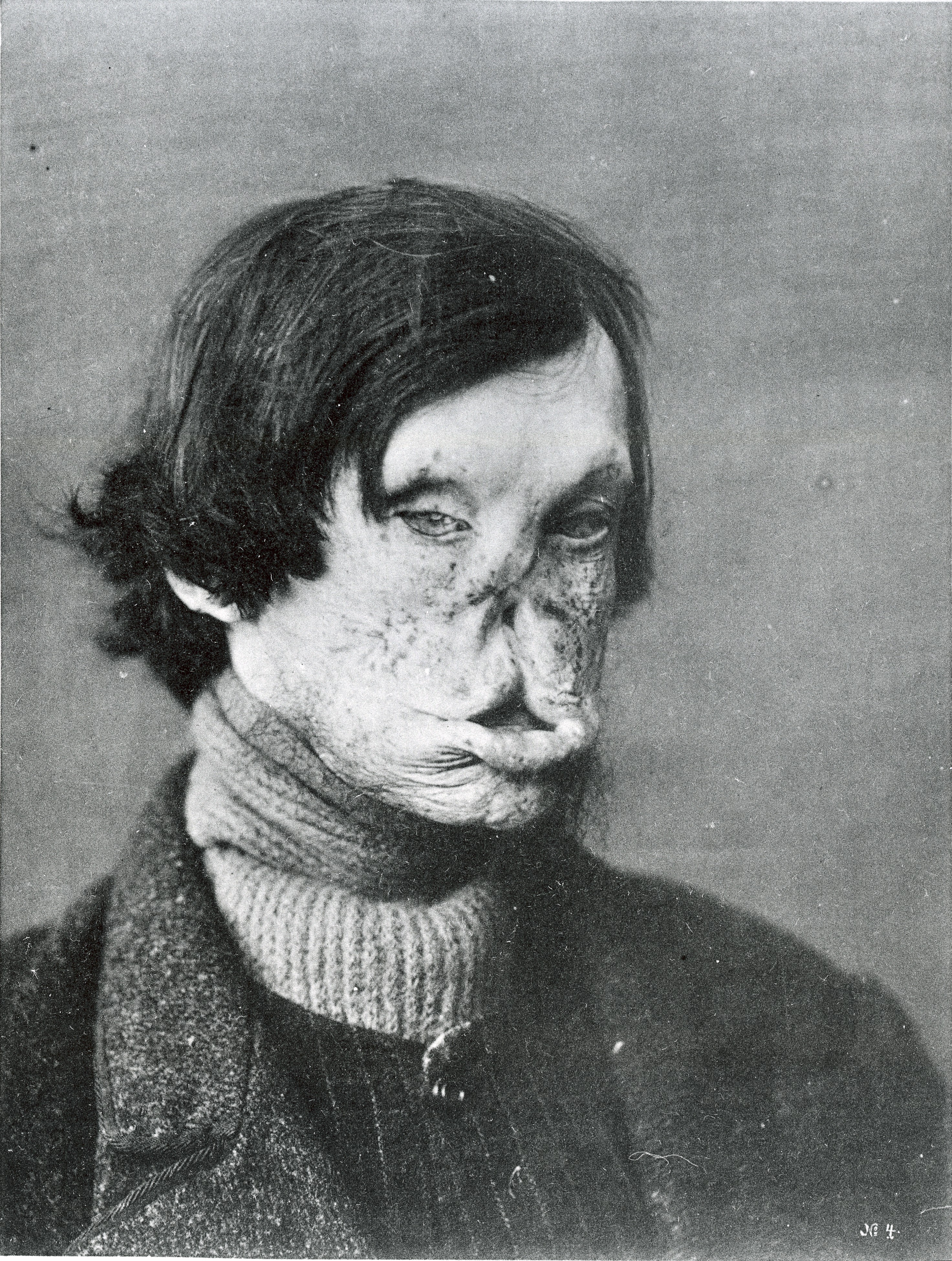
Face severely deformed by leprosy

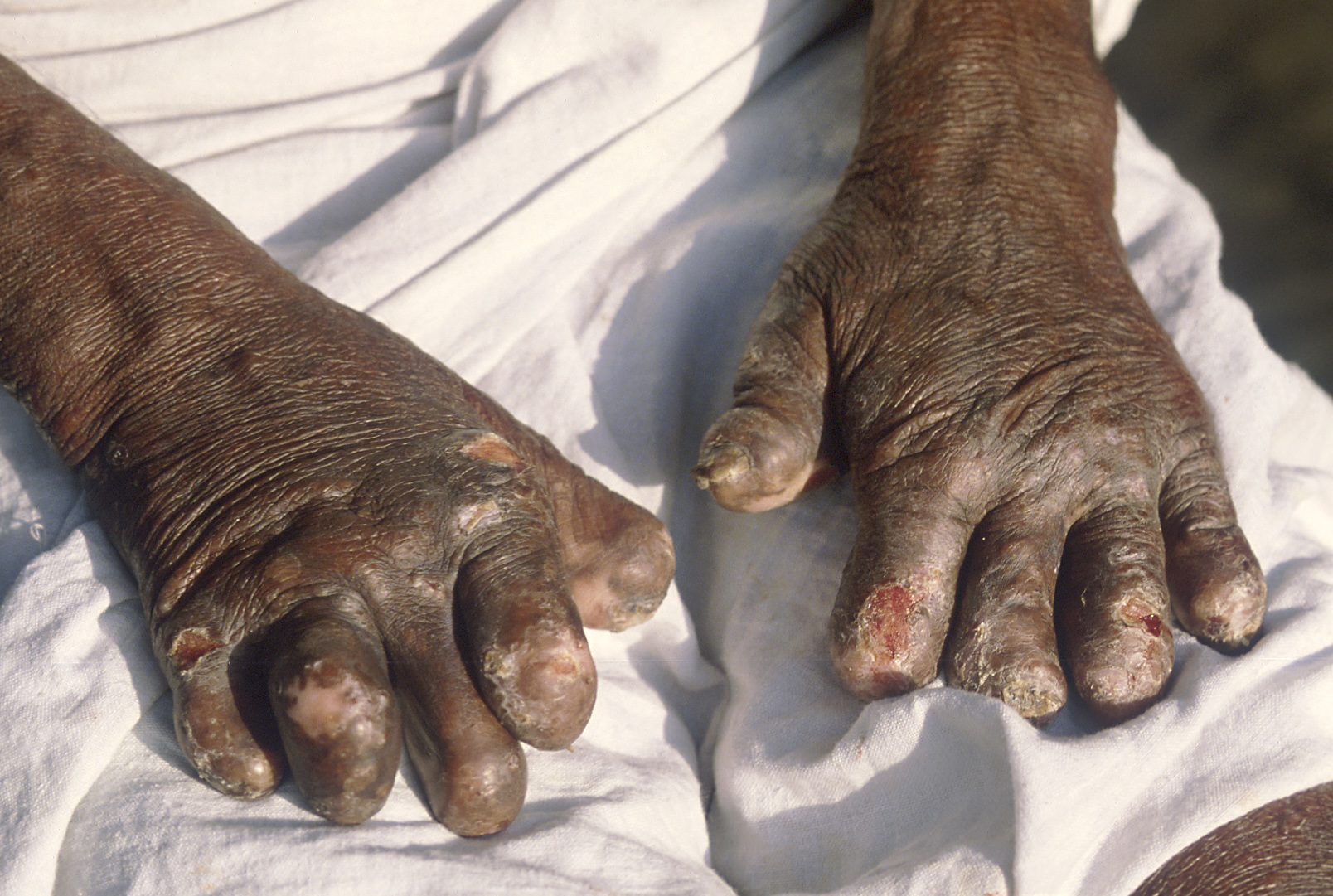
Hands deformed by leprosy

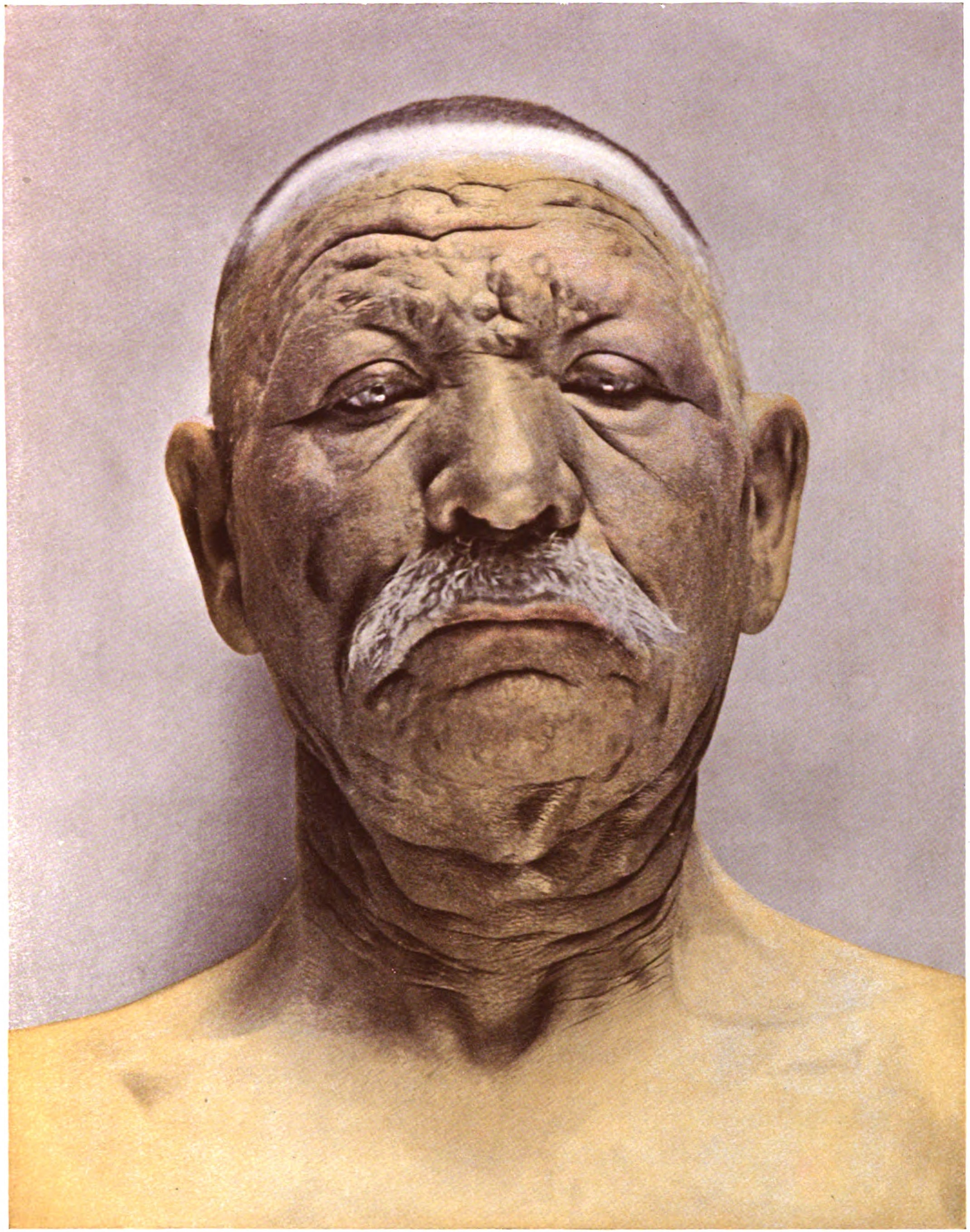
Face mildly deformed by leprosy

== Cause ==
=== Mycobacterium leprae and M. lepromatosis ===
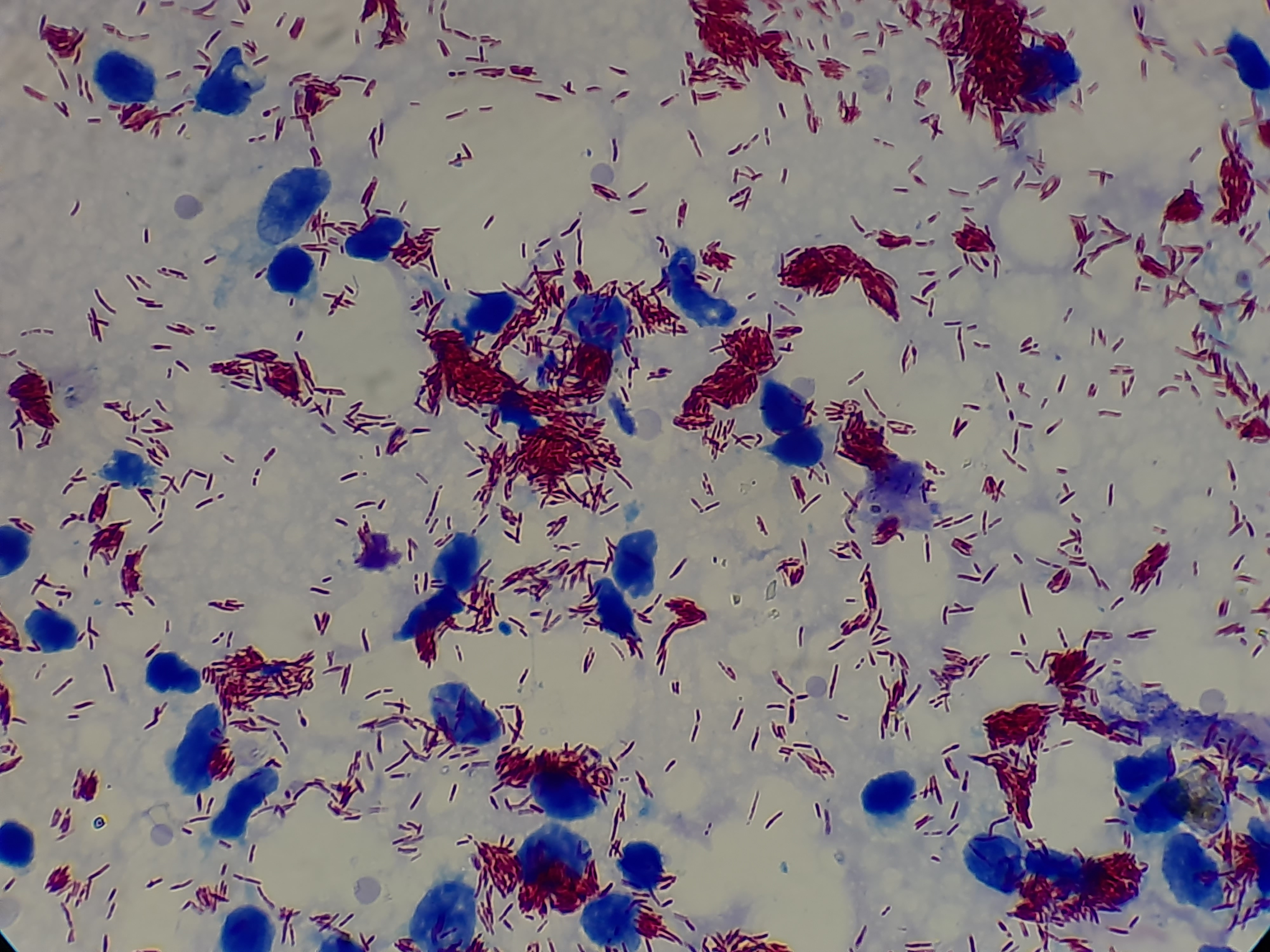
M. leprae, one of the causative agents of leprosy: As an acid-fast bacterium, M. leprae appears red when a Ziehl–Neelsen stain is used

Mycobacterium leprae and Mycobacterium lepromatosis are the mycobacteria that cause leprosy. M. lepromatosis is a relatively newly identified mycobacterium isolated from a fatal case of diffuse lepromatous leprosy in 2008. M. lepromatosis is indistinguishable clinically from M. leprae. M. leprae is an aerobic, rod-shaped, acid-fast bacterium with a waxy cell envelope characteristic of the genus Mycobacterium. M. leprae and M. lepromatosis are obligate intracellular pathogens and cannot grow or be cultured outside of host tissues. However, they can be grown using research animals such as mice and armadillos.

Naturally occurring infections have been reported in nonhuman primates (including the African chimpanzee, the sooty mangabey, and the cynomolgus macaque), armadillos, and red squirrels. Multilocus sequence typing of the armadillo M. leprae strains suggests that they were of human origin for at most a few hundred years. Thus, it is suspected that armadillos first acquired the organism incidentally from early European explorers of the Americas. This incidental transmission was sustained in the armadillo population. It may be transmitted back to humans, making leprosy a zoonotic disease (spread between humans and animals).

Red squirrels (Sciurus vulgaris), a threatened species in Great Britain, were found to carry leprosy in November 2016. It has been suggested that the trade in red squirrel fur, highly prized in the medieval period and intensively traded, may have been responsible for the leprosy epidemic in medieval Europe. A pre-Norman era skull excavated in Hoxne, Suffolk, in 2017 was found to carry DNA from a strain of M. leprae which closely matched the strain carried by modern red squirrels on Brownsea Island.

=== Risk factors ===
The greatest risk factor for developing leprosy is contact with another person infected with leprosy. People who are exposed to a person who has leprosy are 5–8 times more likely to develop leprosy than members of the general population. Leprosy occurs more commonly among those living in poverty. Not all people who are infected with M. leprae develop symptoms.

Conditions that reduce immune function, such as malnutrition, other illnesses, or genetic mutations, may increase the risk of developing leprosy. Infection with HIV does not appear to increase the risk of developing leprosy. Certain genetic factors in the person exposed have been associated with developing lepromatous or tuberculoid leprosy.

=== Transmission ===
Transmission of leprosy occurs during close contact with those who are infected. Transmission of leprosy is through the upper respiratory tract. Older research suggested the skin as the main route of transmission, but research has increasingly favored the respiratory route. Transmission occurs through inhalation of bacilli present in upper airway secretion.

Leprosy is not sexually transmitted and is not spread through pregnancy to the unborn child. The majority (95%) of people who are exposed to M. leprae do not develop leprosy; casual contact such as shaking hands and sitting next to someone with leprosy does not lead to transmission. People are considered non-infectious 72 hours after starting appropriate multi-drug therapy. Two exit routes of M. leprae from the human body that are often described are the skin and the nasal mucosa, although their relative importance is not clear. Lepromatous cases show large numbers of organisms deep in the dermis, but whether they reach the skin surface in sufficient numbers is doubtful. Humans can acquire a leprosy infection from armadillos by handling them or consuming armadillo meat. The mechanism is not fully understood.

=== Genetics ===
Name	Locus	OMIM	Gene
LPRS1	10p13	609888	
LPRS2	6q25	607572	PARK2, PACRG
LPRS3	4q32	246300	TLR2
LPRS4	6p21.3	610988	LTA
LPRS5	4p14	613223	TLR1
LPRS6	13q14.11	613407	

Not all people infected or exposed to M. leprae develop leprosy, and genetic factors are suspected to play a role in susceptibility to an infection. Cases of leprosy often cluster in families, and several genetic variants have been identified. In many who are exposed, the immune system can eliminate the leprosy bacteria during the early infection stage before severe symptoms develop. A genetic defect in cell-mediated immunity may cause a person to be susceptible to developing leprosy symptoms after exposure to the bacteria. The region of DNA responsible for this variability is also involved in Parkinson's disease, giving rise to current speculation that the two disorders may be linked at the biochemical level.

== Pathogenesis ==
Most leprosy complications are the result of nerve damage. The nerve damage occurs due to direct invasion by the M. leprae bacteria and a person's immune response, resulting in inflammation. The molecular mechanism underlying how M. leprae produces the symptoms of leprosy is not clear, but M. leprae has been shown to bind to Schwann cells, which may lead to nerve injury including demyelination and a loss of nerve function (specifically a loss of axonal conductance). Numerous molecular mechanisms have been associated with this nerve damage including the presence of a laminin-binding protein and the glycoconjugate (PGL-1) on the surface of M. leprae that can bind to laminin on peripheral nerves.

As part of the human immune response, white blood cell-derived macrophages may engulf M. leprae by phagocytosis. In the initial stages, small sensory and autonomic nerve fibers in the skin of a person with leprosy are damaged. This damage usually results in hair loss to the area, a loss of the ability to sweat, and numbness (decreased ability to detect sensations such as temperature and touch). Further peripheral nerve damage may result in skin dryness, more numbness, and muscle weakness or paralysis in the affected area. The skin can crack, and if the skin injuries are not carefully cared for, there is a risk for a secondary infection that can lead to more severe damage.

=== Immunology ===
Leprosy exhibits polarized host responses along a Th1–Th2 spectrum that underpins the Ridley–Jopling clinicopathological forms. At the tuberculoid pole (TT/BT), cellular immunity is dominated by Th1 cytokines—notably IL-12, IFN-γ and TNF-α—which activate macrophages, favor granuloma organization, and restrict bacillary multiplication; at the lepromatous pole (BL/LL), there is Th2/regulatory bias (e.g., IL-4, IL-10), weaker cell-mediated immunity, and high bacillary loads with widespread dissemination. This polarization is shaped by antigen-presenting cell function and pattern-recognition events: recognition of mycobacterial ligands by Toll-like receptors—particularly TLR1/2 heterodimers on macrophages, dendritic cells, and Schwann cells—drives Th1-skewing in paucibacillary disease, whereas IL-10-rich regulatory circuits dampen effector responses at the multibacillary pole.

Histopathology reflects these immune states. Tuberculoid lesions show well-formed granulomas composed of epithelioid macrophages and multinucleated giant cells with dense T-cell cuffs, consistent with attempts at bacillary containment; bacilli are scant and often absent on routine sections. By contrast, lepromatous lesions display diffuse sheets of vacuolated "foamy" macrophages packed with bacilli (including globi), fewer cytotoxic effectors, and more permissive tissue microenvironments. Macrophage programs diverge across the spectrum: microbicidal, nitric-oxide–producing phenotypes are more characteristic of the Th1 side, whereas alternative (M2-like), lipid-rich programs prevail at the Th2/regulatory pole.

Additional T-cell axes contribute to bacterial control and tissue damage: Th17/IL-17 responses, typically higher in tuberculoid disease, align with granulomatous inflammation, while FoxP3+ T-regulatory cells and TGF-β/IL-10 pathways are more prominent in multibacillary disease and can suppress protective immunity. Superimposed acute "reactions" represent abrupt shifts on this immunologic continuum. Type 1 (reversal) reactions, usually in borderline disease, involve amplification of Th1-driven inflammation with edema of pre-existing lesions and neuritis. Type 2 reactions (erythema nodosum leprosum) are systemic inflammatory episodes linked to high antigen load and immune-complex formation, with fever, tender nodules, neutrophilia, and other organ involvement; their pathobiology features surges of TNF-α, IL-6, and IL-8, and neutrophil-rich infiltrates.

Beyond T cells and macrophages, humoral immunity and B-cell subsets are also implicated. B-1–like cells (by PAX5/CD5 labeling) and marginal zone B cells in human cutaneous lesions—together with Be1 cells—were more abundant in tuberculoid and type 1 reaction lesions than in lepromatous, type 2 reaction, and indeterminate forms, consistent with Th1-skewed inflammation; IL-10–producing regulatory B cells were infrequent. These findings expand the repertoire of cellular players involved at the paucibacillary/Th1 pole of the leprosy spectrum.

== Diagnosis ==
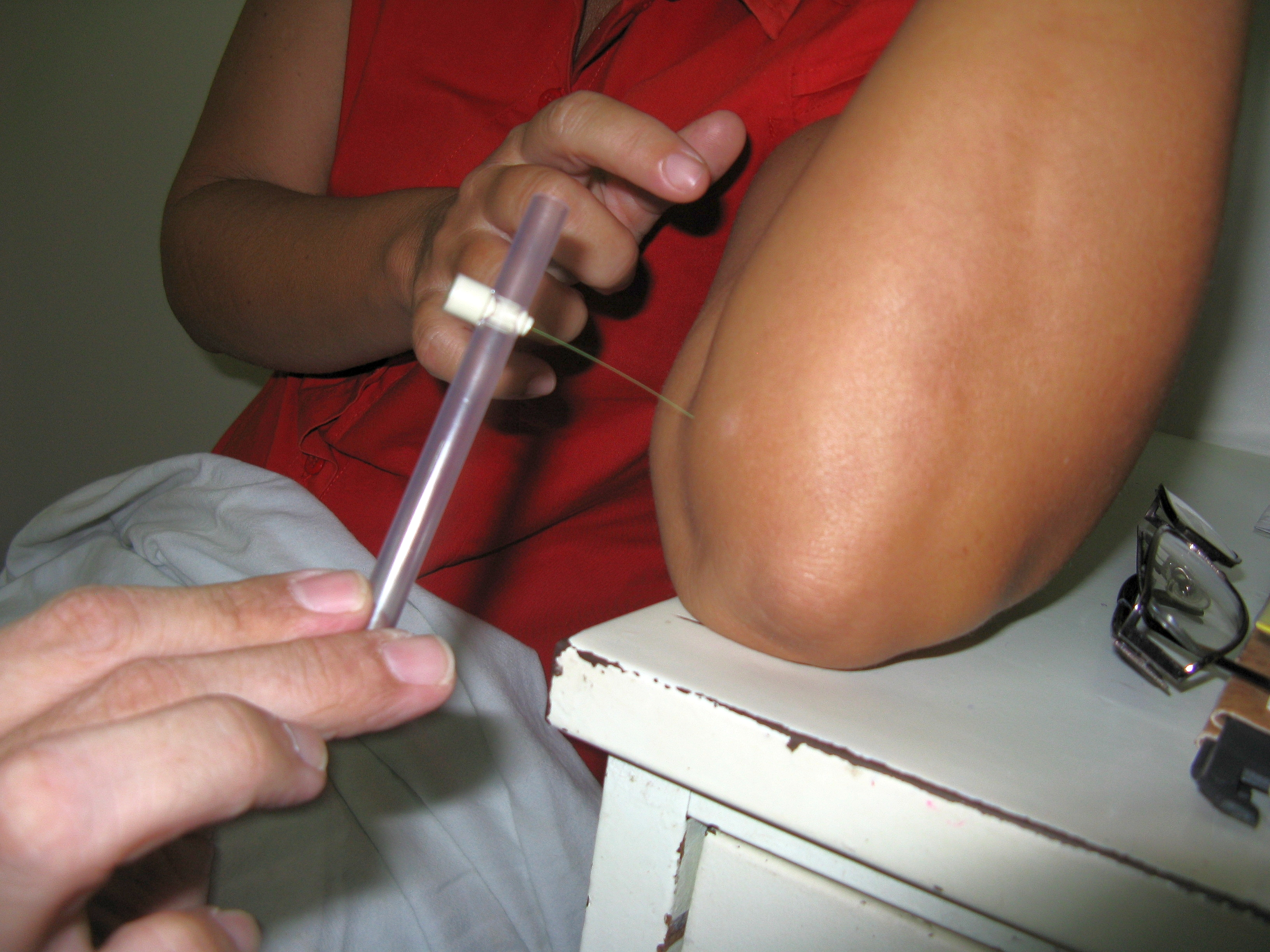
Testing for loss of sensation with monofilament

In countries where people are frequently infected, a person is considered to have leprosy if they have one of the following two signs:

- Skin lesion consistent with leprosy and with definite sensory loss.
- Positive skin smears.

Skin lesions can be single or multiple, usually hypopigmented, although occasionally reddish or copper-colored. The lesions may be flat (macules), raised (papules), or solid elevated areas (nodular). Experiencing sensory loss at the skin lesion is a feature that can help determine if the lesion is caused by leprosy or by another disorder such as tinea versicolor. Thickened nerves are associated with leprosy and can be accompanied by loss of sensation or muscle weakness, but muscle weakness without the characteristic skin lesion and sensory loss is not considered a reliable sign of leprosy. In some cases, the presence of acid-fast leprosy bacilli in skin smears is considered diagnostic; however, the diagnosis is typically made without laboratory tests, based on symptoms. If a person has a new leprosy diagnosis and already has a visible disability caused by leprosy, the diagnosis is considered late.

In countries or areas where leprosy is uncommon, such as the United States, diagnosis of leprosy is often delayed because healthcare providers are unaware of leprosy and its symptoms. Early diagnosis and treatment prevent nerve involvement, the hallmark of leprosy, and the disability it causes. There is no recommended test to diagnose latent leprosy in people without symptoms. Few people with latent leprosy test positive for anti PGL-1. The presence of M. leprae bacterial DNA can be identified using a polymerase chain reaction (PCR)-based technique. This molecular test alone is not sufficient to diagnose a person, but this approach may be used to identify someone who is at high risk of developing or transmitting leprosy such as those with few lesions or an atypical clinical presentation. New approaches propose tools to diagnose leprosy through artificial intelligence.

=== Classification ===
Several approaches for classifying leprosy exist. There are similarities between the classification approaches.

- The World Health Organization (WHO) system distinguishes patients with five or fewer skin lesions and no bacilli in a skin smear as "paucibacillary" ("pauci-" refers to a small quantity) from patients with more lesions or detected bacilli as "multibacillary".
- The Ridley-Jopling scale provides five gradations.
- The ICD-10, though developed by the WHO, uses Ridley-Jopling, not the WHO system. It also adds an indeterminate ("I") entry.
- In MeSH, three groupings are used.

WHO	Ridley-Jopling	ICD-10	MeSH	Description	Lepromin test
Paucibacillary	tuberculoid ("TT"), borderline tuberculoid ("BT")	A30.1, A30.2	Tuberculoid	It is characterized by one or more hypopigmented skin macules and patches where skin sensations are lost because of damaged peripheral nerves that have been attacked by the human host's immune cells. TT is characterized by the formation of epithelioid cell granulomas with a large number of epithelioid cells. In this form of leprosy, Mycobacterium leprae is either absent from the lesion or occurs in very small numbers. This type of leprosy is most benign.	Positive
Multibacillary	midborderline or borderline ("BB")	A30.3	Borderline	Borderline leprosy is of intermediate severity and is the most common form. Skin lesions resemble tuberculoid leprosy, but are more numerous and irregular; large patches may affect a whole limb, and peripheral nerve involvement with weakness and loss of sensation is common. This type is unstable and may become more like lepromatous leprosy or may undergo a reversal reaction, becoming more like the tuberculoid form.	Negative
Multibacillary	borderline lepromatous ("BL"), and lepromatous ("LL")	A30.4, A30.5	Lepromatous	It is associated with symmetric skin lesions, nodules, plaques, thickened dermis, and frequent involvement of the nasal mucosa resulting in nasal congestion and nose bleeds, but, typically, detectable nerve damage is late. Loss of eyebrows and lashes can be seen in advanced disease. LL is characterized by the absence of epithelioid cells in the lesions. In this form of leprosy, Mycobacteria leprae are found in lesions in large numbers. This is the most unfavorable clinical variant of leprosy, which occurs with a generalized lesion of the skin, mucous membranes, eyes, peripheral nerves, lymph nodes, and internal organs. Histoid leprosy is a rare variation of multibacillary, lepromatous leprosy.	Negative

Leprosy may also occur with only neural involvement, without skin lesions.

== Complications ==
Leprosy causes tissue loss and deformity by attacking nerve endings, leading to loss of sensation and increased injury risk. Injuries can become infected, causing tissue damage and shortening of fingers, toes, and limbs.

== Prevention ==
Early disease detection is important, since physical and neurological damage may be irreversible even if cured. Medications can decrease the risk of those living with people who have leprosy from acquiring the disease, and likely those with whom people with leprosy come into contact outside the home. The WHO recommends that preventive medicine be given to people who are in close contact with someone who has leprosy. The suggested preventive treatment is a single dose of rifampicin in adults and children over 2 years old who do not already have leprosy or tuberculosis. Preventive treatment is associated with a 57% reduction in infections within 2 years and a 30% reduction in infections within 6 years.

The Bacillus Calmette–Guérin (BCG) vaccine offers a variable amount of protection against leprosy in addition to its closely related target of tuberculosis. It appears to be 26% to 41% effective (based on controlled trials) and about 60% effective based on observational studies, with two doses possibly working better than one. The WHO concluded in 2018 that the BCG vaccine at birth reduces leprosy risk and is recommended in countries with high incidence of TB and people who have leprosy. People living in the same home as a person with leprosy are suggested to take a BCG booster which may improve their immunity by 56%. Development of a more effective vaccine is ongoing.

A novel vaccine called LepVax entered clinical trials in 2017 with the first encouraging results reported on 24 participants published in 2020. If successful, this would be the first leprosy-specific vaccine available.

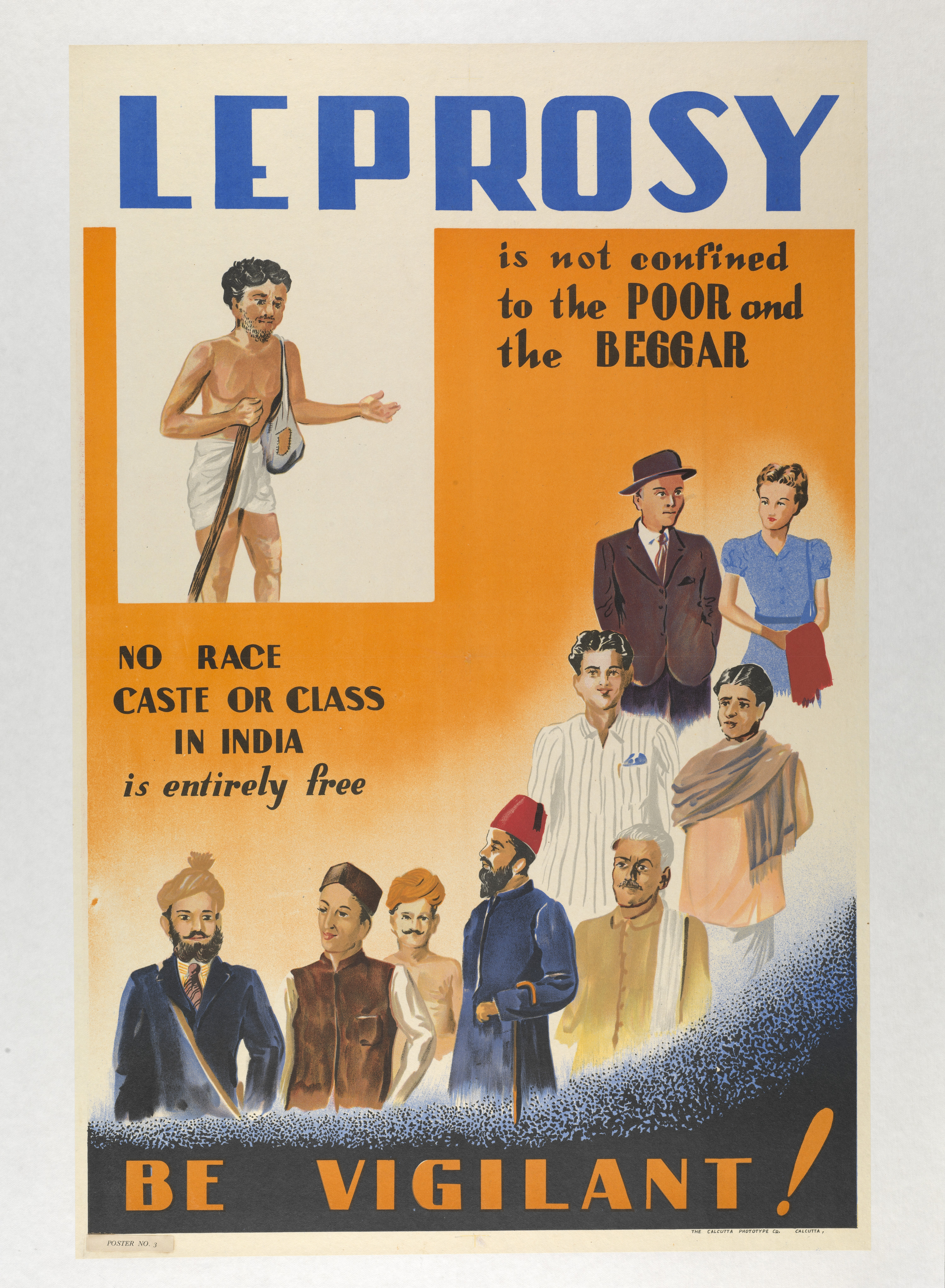
Leprosy prevention poster

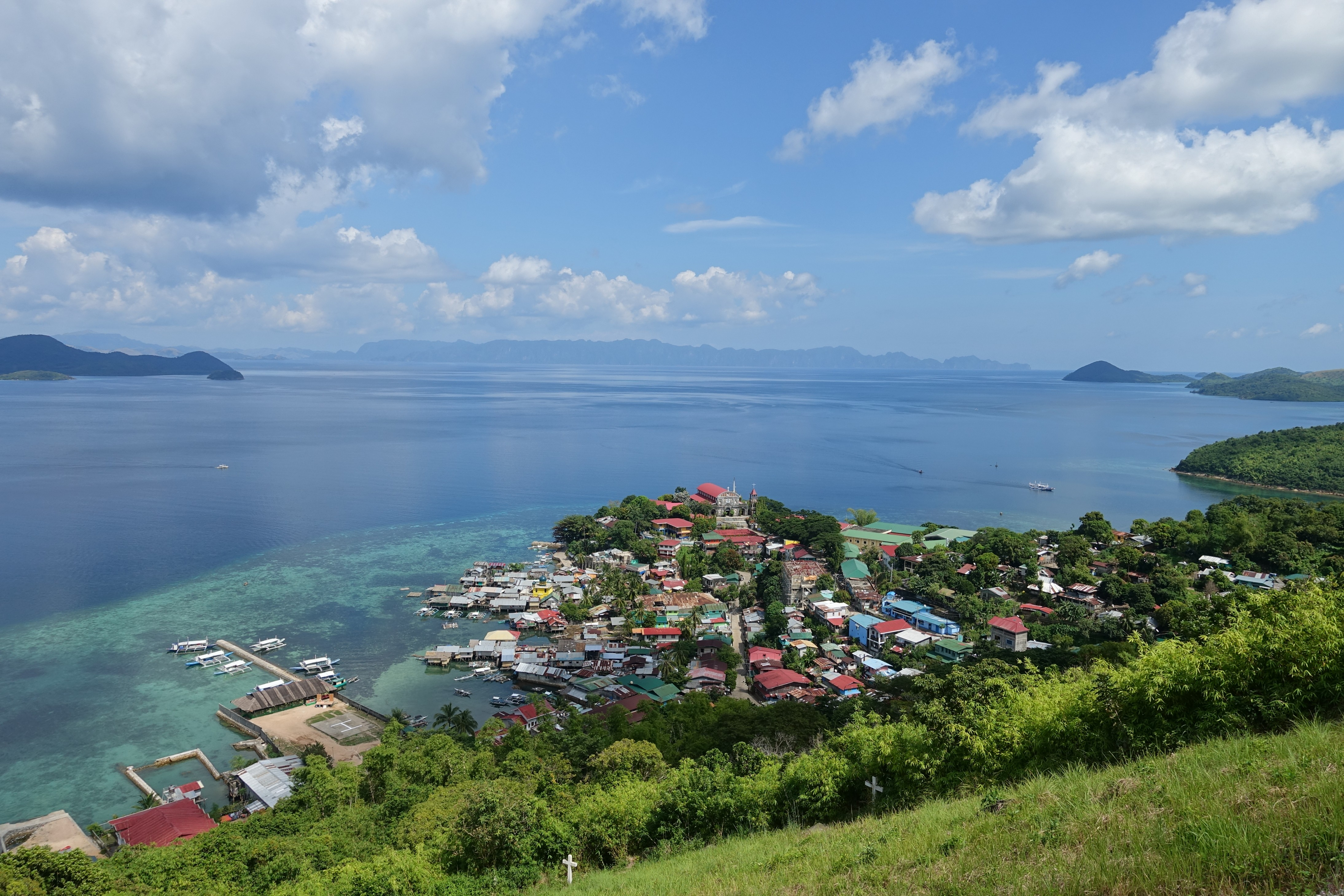
Culion leper colony in Culion old town in Palawan, Philippines, used to shelter one of the largest populations of lepers in Asia, numbering between 3,500 and 4,000 in the early 1900s.

== Treatment ==
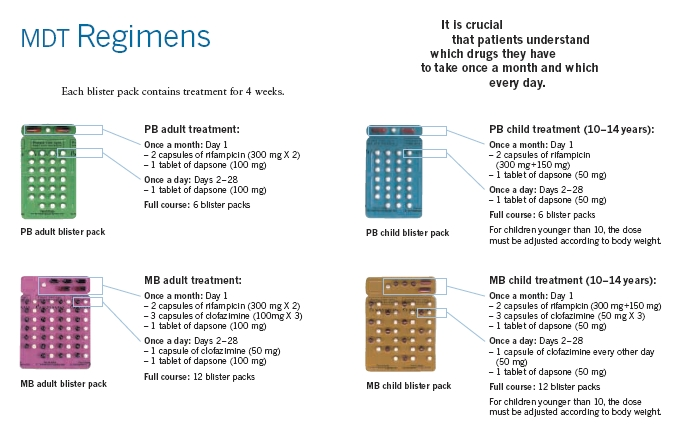
MDT antileprosy drugs: standard regimens from 2010

Several leprostatic agents are available for treatment. A three-drug regimen of rifampicin, dapsone, and clofazimine is recommended for all people with leprosy, for six months for paucibacillary leprosy and 12 months for multibacillary leprosy. Multidrug therapy (MDT) remains highly effective, and people are no longer infectious after the first monthly dose. MDT is safe and easy to use under field conditions because it is available in calendar-labelled blister packs. The treatment does pose compliance challenges for young children who find swallowing multiple solid pills difficult. Post-treatment relapse rates remain low.

The combination treatment accelerates treatment and decreases the chance of creating drug-resistant bacteria. All three drugs in the three-drug regimen are antibacterial, with rifampicin being the most potent. Rifampicin is scheduled monthly since it interferes with dapsone by inducing its increased metabolism.

Resistance to the three-drug regimen has been reported in several countries, although the number of cases is small. People with rifampicin-resistant leprosy may be treated with second-line medications such as fluoroquinolones, minocycline, or clarithromycin, but the treatment duration is 24 months because of their lower bactericidal activity. Evidence on the potential benefits and harms of alternative regimens for drug-resistant leprosy is not available.

For people with nerve damage, protective footwear may help prevent ulcers and secondary infections. Canvas shoes may be better than PVC boots. There may be no difference between double rocker shoes and below-knee plaster. Topical ketanserin seems to have a better effect on ulcer healing than clioquinol cream or zinc paste, but the evidence for this is weak. Phenytoin applied to the skin improves skin changes to a greater degree when compared to saline dressings.

== Prognosis ==
Although leprosy has been curable since the mid-20th century, if left untreated, it can cause permanent physical impairments and damage to a person's nerves, skin, eyes, and limbs. Despite leprosy not being very infectious and having a low pathogenicity, there is still significant stigma and prejudice associated with the disease. Because of this stigma, leprosy can affect a person's participation in social activities and may also affect the lives of their family and friends. People with leprosy are also at a higher risk for problems with their mental well-being. The social stigma may contribute to problems obtaining employment, financial difficulties, and social isolation. Efforts to reduce discrimination and reduce the stigma surrounding leprosy may help improve outcomes for people with leprosy.

== Epidemiology ==
Reported cases of leprosy

In 2018, 208,619 new cases of leprosy were recorded, a slight decrease from 2017. In 2015, 94% of the new leprosy cases were confined to 14 countries. India reported the greatest number of new cases (60% of reported cases), followed by Brazil (13%) and Indonesia (8%). Although the number of cases worldwide continues to fall, there are parts of the world where leprosy is more common, including Brazil, South Asia (India, Nepal, Bhutan), some parts of Africa (Tanzania, Madagascar, Mozambique), and the western Pacific. About 150 to 250 cases are diagnosed in the United States each year.

In the 1960s, there were tens of millions of leprosy cases recorded when the bacteria started to develop resistance to dapsone, the most common treatment option at the time. International (e.g., the WHO's "Global Strategy for Reducing Disease Burden Due to Leprosy" and the International Federation of Anti-Leprosy Associations) and national initiatives have reduced the total number and the number of new cases of the disease.

The number of new leprosy cases is difficult to measure and monitor because of leprosy's long incubation period, delays in diagnosis after the onset of the disease, and lack of medical care in affected areas. The registered prevalence of the disease is used to determine disease burden. Registered prevalence is a useful proxy indicator of the disease burden, as it reflects the number of active leprosy cases diagnosed with the disease and receiving treatment with MDT at a given point in time. The prevalence rate is defined as the number of cases registered for MDT treatment among the population in which the cases have occurred, again at a given point in time.

Year	No. of new cases
2005	296,479
2006	258,980
2007	252,541
2008	249,018
2009	244,797
2010	228,488
2011	224,344
2012	232,847
2013	215,636
2014	213,861
2015	211,945
2016	217,927
2017	210,973
2018	208,613
2019	202,166
2020	127,506
2021	140,546
2022	174,059
2023	182,792
2024	215,636

== History ==
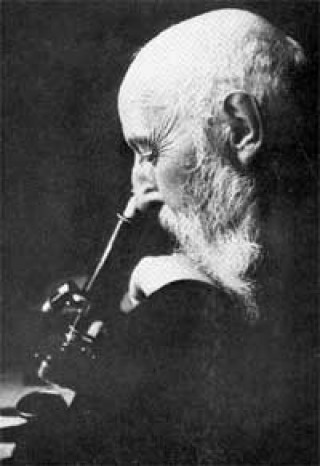
Norwegian physician Gerhard Armauer Hansen (1841–1912) discovered M. leprae in 1873.

=== Historical distribution ===
Using comparative genomics, in 2005, geneticists traced the origins and worldwide distribution of leprosy from East Africa or the Near East along human migration routes. They found four strains of M. leprae with specific regional locations: Monot et al. (2005) determined that leprosy originated in East Africa or the Near East and traveled with humans along their migration routes, including those of trade in goods and slaves. The four strains of M. leprae are based in specific geographic regions where each predominantly occurs:

- strain 1 in Asia, the Pacific region, and East Africa;
- strain 2 in Ethiopia, Malawi, Nepal, north India, and New Caledonia;
- strain 3 in Europe, North Africa, and the Americas;
- strain 4 in West Africa and the Caribbean.

This confirms the spread of the disease along the migration, colonisation, and slave trade routes taken from East Africa to India, West Africa to the New World, and from Africa to Europe and vice versa.

Skeletal remains discovered in 2009 represent the oldest documented evidence for leprosy, dating to the 2nd millennium BC. Located at Balathal, Rajasthan, in northwest India, the discoverers suggest that if the disease did migrate from Africa to India during the 3rd millennium BC "at a time when there was substantial interaction among the Indus Civilization, Mesopotamia, and Egypt, there needs to be additional skeletal and molecular evidence of leprosy in India and Africa to confirm the African origin of the disease". A proven human case was verified by DNA taken from the shrouded remains of a man discovered by researchers from the Hebrew University of Jerusalem in a tomb in Akeldama, next to the Old City of Jerusalem dated by radiocarbon methods to the first half of the 1st century.

The oldest strains of leprosy known from Europe are from Great Chesterford in southeast England and date back to AD 415–545. These findings suggest a different path for the spread of leprosy, meaning it may have originated in Western Eurasia. This study also indicates that there were more strains in Europe at the time than previously determined.

=== Discovery and scientific progress ===
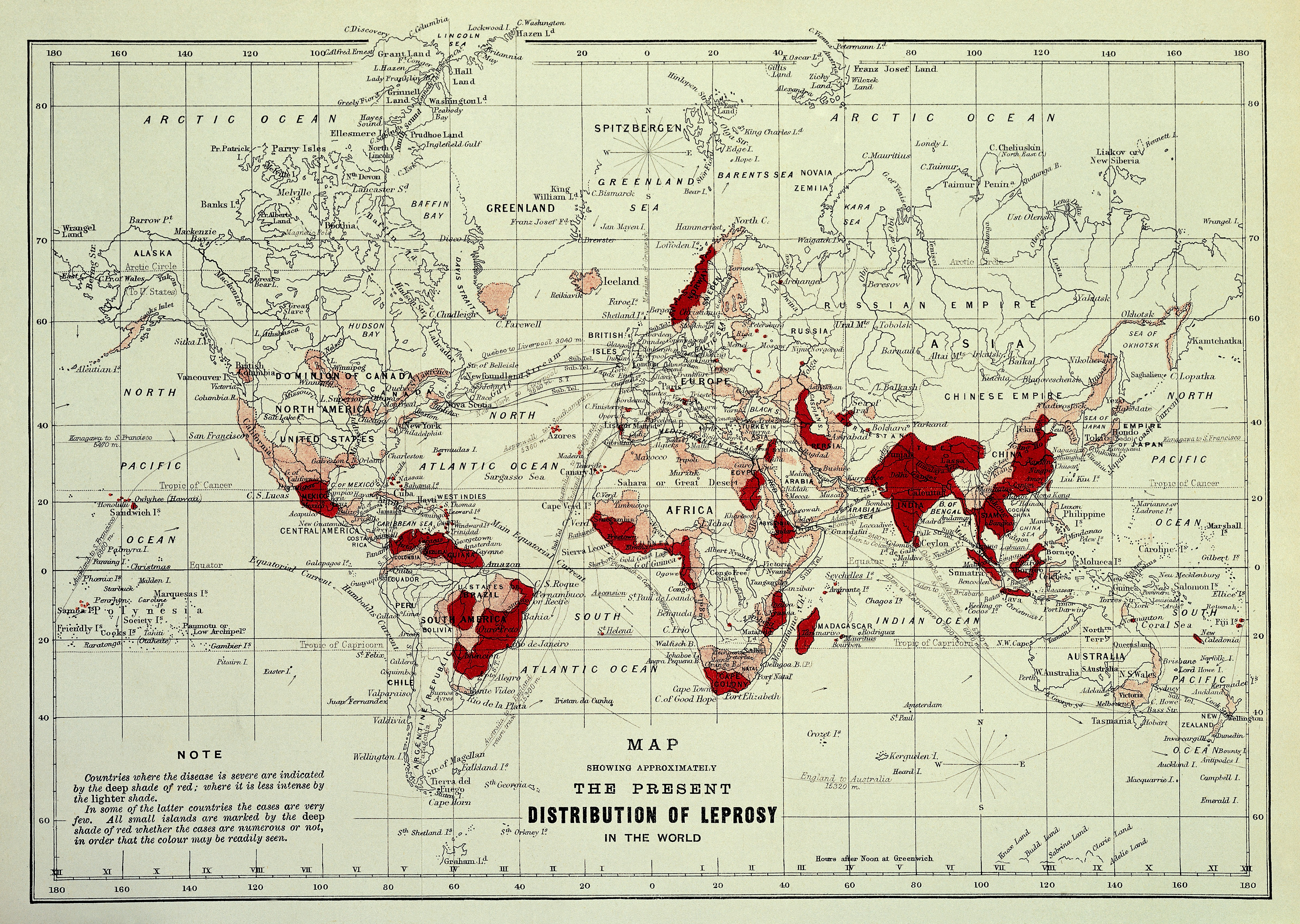
Distribution of leprosy around the world in 1891

Literary attestation of leprosy is unclear because of the ambiguity of many early sources, including the Indian Atharvaveda and Kausika Sutra, the Egyptian Ebers Papyrus, and the Hebrew Bible's various sections regarding signs of impurity (tzaraath). Leprotic symptoms are attested in the Indian doctor Sushruta's Compendium, originally dating to c. 600 BC but only surviving in emended texts no earlier than the fifth century BC. Symptoms consistent with leprosy were possibly described by Hippocrates in 460 BC. However, Hansen's disease probably did not exist in Greece or the Middle East before the Common Era. In 1846, Francis Adams produced The Seven Books of Paulus Aegineta which included a commentary on all medical and surgical knowledge and descriptions and remedies to do with leprosy from the Romans, Greeks, and Arabs.

The first known causative agent of leprosy, M. leprae, was discovered by Gerhard Armauer Hansen in Norway in 1873, making it one of the first species of pathogenic bacteria to be identified. Leprosy was once believed to have been absent from the Americas before the age of Discovery and the arrival of Europeans. In 2008, a different causative agent for leprosy, Mycobacterium lepromatosis was discovered. DNA studies have revealed that this pathogen exists primarily in the Americas and was already present before Europeans arrived. It is believed that it did not exist in Polynesia until the middle of the 19th century.

=== Treatment ===
Leprosy was once believed to be highly contagious and was treated with mercury. Chaulmoogra tree oil was used topically to manage Hansen's disease for centuries. Chaulmoogra oil could not be taken orally without causing nausea or injected without forming an abscess. In 1915, Alice Ball discovered how to make the oil water-soluble, which produced marked improvements in patients with Hansen's disease.

The first effective drug (promin) became available in the 1940s. In the 1950s, dapsone was introduced. The search for further effective antileprosy drugs led to the use of clofazimine and rifampicin in the 1960s and 1970s. Later, Indian scientist Shantaram Yawalkar and his colleagues formulated a combined therapy using rifampicin and dapsone, intended to mitigate bacterial resistance. Combining all three drugs was first recommended by the WHO in 1981. These three drugs are still used in the standard MDT regimens. Resistance has developed to initial treatment. Until the introduction of MDT in the early 1980s, leprosy could not be diagnosed and treated successfully within the community.

The importance of the nasal mucosa in the transmission of M. leprae was recognized as early as 1898 by Schäffer, particularly the ulcerated mucosa. The mechanism of plantar ulceration in leprosy and its treatment was first described by Ernest W. Price.

=== Treatment cost ===
Between 1995 and 1999, the WHO, with the aid of the Nippon Foundation, supplied all endemic countries with free MDT in blister packs, channeled through ministries of health. This free provision was extended in 2000 and again in 2005, 2010, and 2015 with donations by the MDT manufacturer Novartis through the WHO. At the national level, non-governmental organizations (NGOs) affiliated with the national program will continue to be provided with an appropriate free supply.

== Etymology ==
The word "leprosy" comes from the Greek word "λέπος (lépos) – skin" and "λεπερός (leperós) – scaly man".

== Society and culture ==
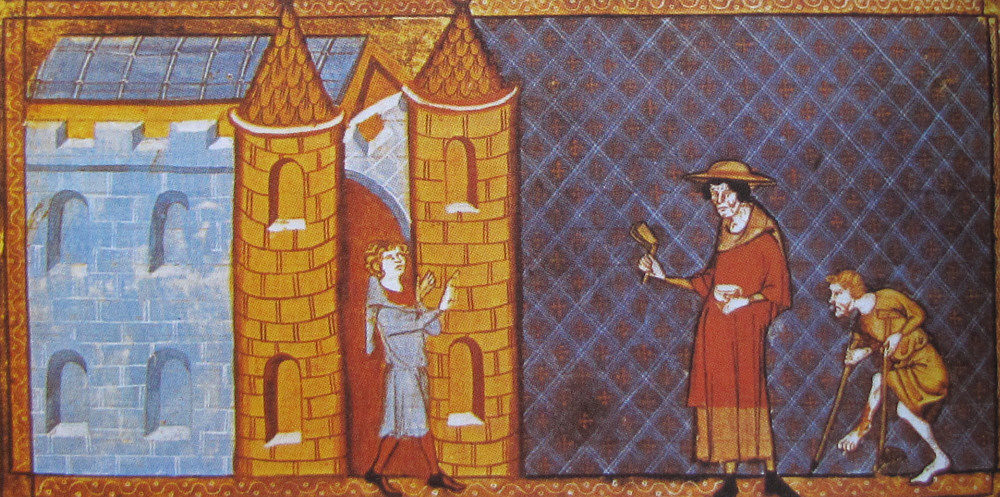
Two lepers denied entrance to town, 14th century

=== Historical texts ===
Written accounts of leprosy date back thousands of years. By 600 BC, various skin diseases translated as leprosy appear in the Atharva Veda, a principal Hindu scripture. Another Hindu scripture, the Manusmriti (200 BC), prohibits contact with those infected with the disease and makes marriage to a person infected with leprosy punishable.

The Hebraic root tsara or tsaraath (צָרַע, – tsaw-rah' – to be struck with leprosy, to be leprous) and the Greek (λεπρός – lepros), are of broader classification than the more narrow use of the term related to Hansen's Disease. Any progressive skin disease (a whitening or splotchy bleaching of the skin, raised manifestations of scales, scabs, infections, rashes, etc.)—as well as generalized molds and surface discoloration of any clothing, leather, or discoloration on walls or surfaces throughout homes—all came under the "law of leprosy" (Leviticus 14:54–57). Ancient sources such as the Talmud (Sifra 63) make clear that tzaraath refers to various types of lesions or stains associated with ritual impurity and occurring on cloth, leather, or houses, as well as skin. Traditional Judaism and Jewish rabbinical authorities, both historical and modern, emphasize that the tsaraath of Leviticus is a spiritual ailment with no direct relationship to Hansen's disease or physical contagions. The relation of tsaraath to "leprosy" comes from translations of Hebrew Biblical texts into Greek and ensuing misconceptions.

All three Synoptic Gospels of the New Testament describe instances of Jesus healing people with leprosy (Matthew 8:1–4, Mark 1:40–45, and Luke 5:12–16). The Bible's description of leprosy is congruous (if lacking detail) with the symptoms of modern leprosy, but the relationship between this disease, tzaraath, and Hansen's disease has been disputed. The biblical perception that people with leprosy were unclean can be found in a passage from Leviticus 13:44–46. While this text defines the leper as impure, it does not explicitly make a moral judgement on those with leprosy. Some early Christians believed that God was punishing those affected by leprosy for sinful behavior. Moral associations have persisted throughout history. In the 6th century, Pope Gregory the Great and Isidore of Seville considered people with the disease to be heretics.

=== Middle Ages ===
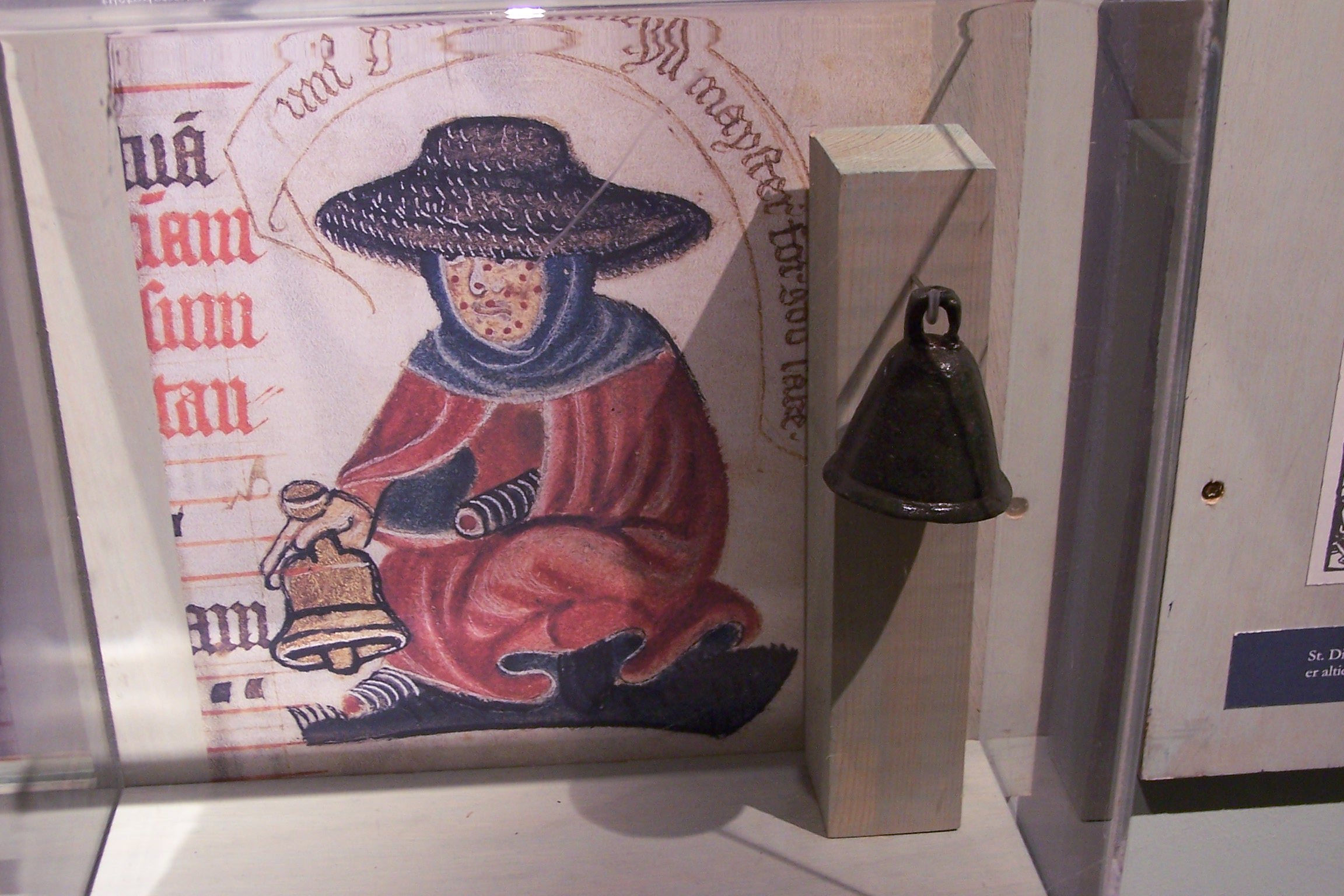
Medieval leper bell

The general population's perception of leprosy was mixed. On one hand, people feared getting infected with the disease and thought of people suspected of leprosy to be unclean, untrustworthy, and occasionally morally corrupt. On the other hand, Jesus' interaction with lepers, the writing of church leaders, and the Christian focus on charitable works led to viewing the lepers as "chosen by God" or seeing the disease as a means of obtaining access to heaven.

Early medieval understanding of leprosy was influenced by early Christian writers such as Gregory of Nazianzus and John Chrysostom, whose writings were later embraced by Byzantine and Latin writers. Gregory, for example, composed sermons urging Christians to assist victims of the disease, and he condemned pagans or Christians who justified rejecting lepers on the allegation that God had sent them the disease to punish them. As cases of leprosy increased in the Eastern Roman Empire, becoming a major health issue, the ecclesiastic leaders discussed how to assist those affected as well as how to change the attitude of society towards them. They also tried this by using the name "holy disease" instead of the commonly used "elephant's disease" (elephantiasis), implying that God did not create this disease to punish people but to purify them for heaven. Although not always successful in persuading the public and a cure was never found by Greek medicians, they created an environment where victims could get palliative care and were never expressly banned from society, as sometimes happened in western Europe. Theodore Balsamon, a 12th-century jurist in Constantinople, noted that lepers were allowed to enter the same churches, cities, and assemblies that healthy people attended.

As the disease became more prevalent in Western Europe in the fifth century, efforts began to establish permanent institutions to house and feed lepers. These efforts were, inclusively, the work of bishops in France at the end of the sixth century, such as in Chalon-sur-Saône. The increase in hospitals or leprosaria (sing. leprosarium) that treated people with leprosy in the 12th and 13th centuries seems to indicate a rise in cases, possibly in connection with the increase in urbanisation as well as returning crusaders from the Middle East. France alone had nearly 2,000 leprosaria during this period. Additionally to the new leprosia, further steps were taken by secular and religious leaders to prevent further spread of the disease. The third Lateran Council of 1179 required lepers to have their own priests and churches and a 1346 edict by King Edward expelled lepers from city limits. Segregation from mainstream society became common, and people with leprosy were often required to wear clothing that identified them as such or carry a bell announcing their presence. As in the East, it was the Church who took care of the lepers due to the persisting moral stigma and who ran the leprosaria. Although the leprosaria in Western Europe removed the sick from society, they were never a place to quarantine them or from which they could not leave: lepers would go beg for alms for the upkeep of the leprosaria or meet with their families.

Multiple groups in Western Europe from the Middle Ages faced social ostracization and discrimination that was justified, in part, due to claims that they were the descendants of lepers. These groups included the Cagots and the Caquins.

=== 19th century ===
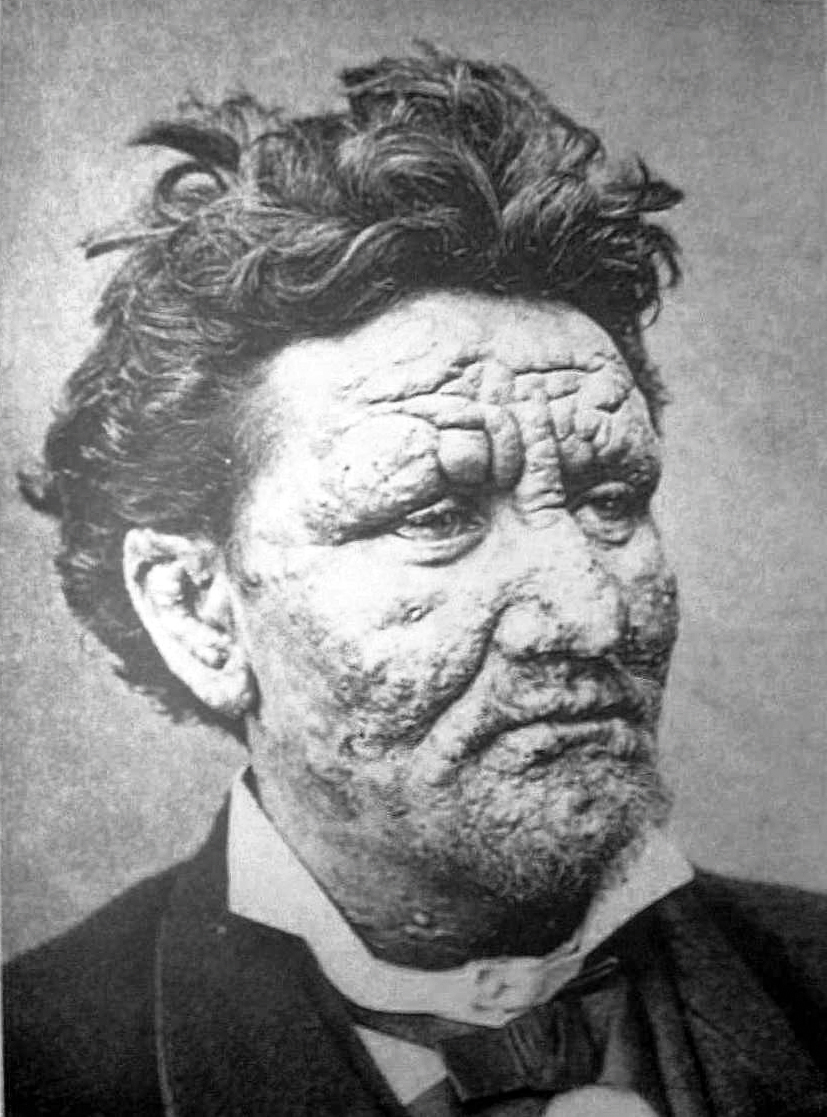
A 24-year-old man with leprosy, 1886

Norway was the location of a progressive stance on leprosy tracking and treatment, and played an influential role in European understanding of the disease. In 1832, Dr. JJ Hjort conducted the first leprosy survey, thus establishing a basis for epidemiological surveys. Subsequent surveys led to the establishment of a national leprosy registry to study the causes of leprosy and to track the rate of infection. Early leprosy research throughout Europe was conducted by Norwegian scientists Daniel Cornelius Danielssen and Carl Wilhelm Boeck. Their work resulted in the establishment of the National Leprosy Research and Treatment Center. Danielssen and Boeck believed the cause of leprosy transmission was hereditary. This stance was influential in advocating for the isolation of those infected by sex to prevent reproduction.

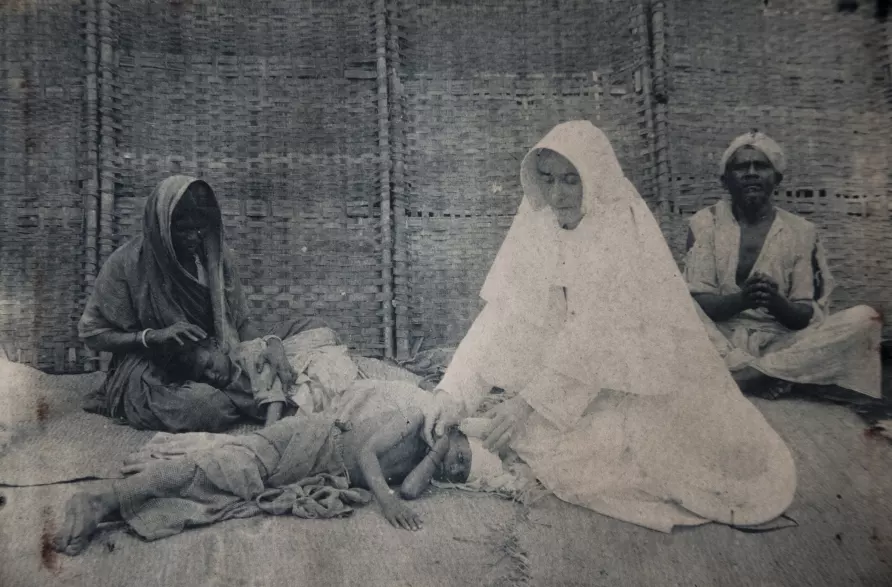
Mary Glowrey (1887–1957) with a patient with leprosy in Guntur, India circa 1926

Though leprosy rates were on the decline in the Western world by the 1860s, authorities frequently embraced isolation treatment due to a combination of reasons, including fears of the disease spreading from the Global South, efforts by Christian missionaries and a lack of understanding concerning bacteriology, medical diagnosis and how contagious the disease was. The rapid expansion of Western imperialism during the Victorian era resulted in westerners coming into increasing contact with regions where the disease was endemic, including British India. English surgeon Henry Vandyke Carter observed isolation treatment for leprosy patients first-hand while visiting Norway, applying these methods in British India with the financial and logistical assistance of Protestant missionaries. Colonialist and religious viewpoints of the disease continued to be a major factor in the treatment and public perception of the disease in the Global South until decolonization in the mid-20th century.

=== 20th and 21st century ===
In 1898, the colonial government in British India enacted the Leprosy Act of 1898, which mandated the compulsory segregation of people with leprosy by authorities in newly established leper asylums, where they were segregated by sex to prevent sexual activity. The act, which proved difficult to enforce, was repealed in 1983 by the Indian government after MDT had become widely available in India. In 1983, the National Leprosy Elimination Programme, previously the National Leprosy Control Programme, changed its methods from surveillance to the treatment of people with leprosy. India still accounts for over half of the global disease burden. According to the WHO, new cases in India during 2019 diminished to 114,451 patients (57% of the world's total new cases). Until 2019, Indians could justify a petition for divorce with their spouse's diagnosis of leprosy.

The National Leprosarium at Carville, Louisiana, known in 1955 as the Louisiana Leper Home, was the only leprosy hospital in the mainland United States. Leprosy patients from all over the United States were sent to Carville to be kept in isolation away from the public, as not much about leprosy transmission was known at the time, and stigma against those with leprosy was high. The Carville leprosarium was known for its innovations in reconstructive surgery for those with leprosy. In 1941, 22 patients at Carville underwent trials for a new drug called Promin. The results were described as miraculous, and soon after the success of promin came dapsone, a medicine even more effective in the fight against leprosy. Leprosy incidence peaked in the United States in 1983, followed by a steep decline. However, case numbers have been slowly rising again since 2000. In 2020, 159 cases were reported in the country.

=== Stigma ===
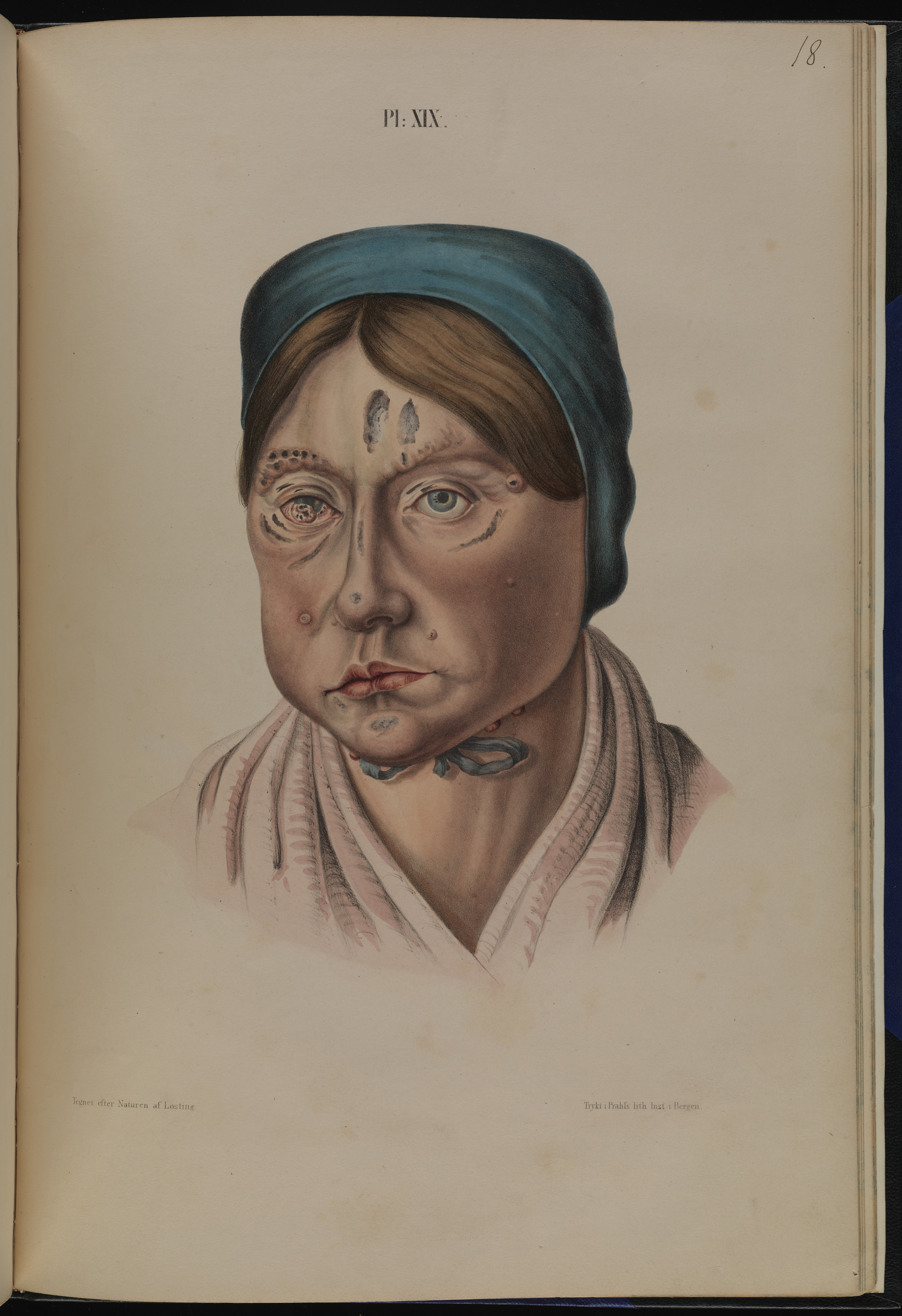
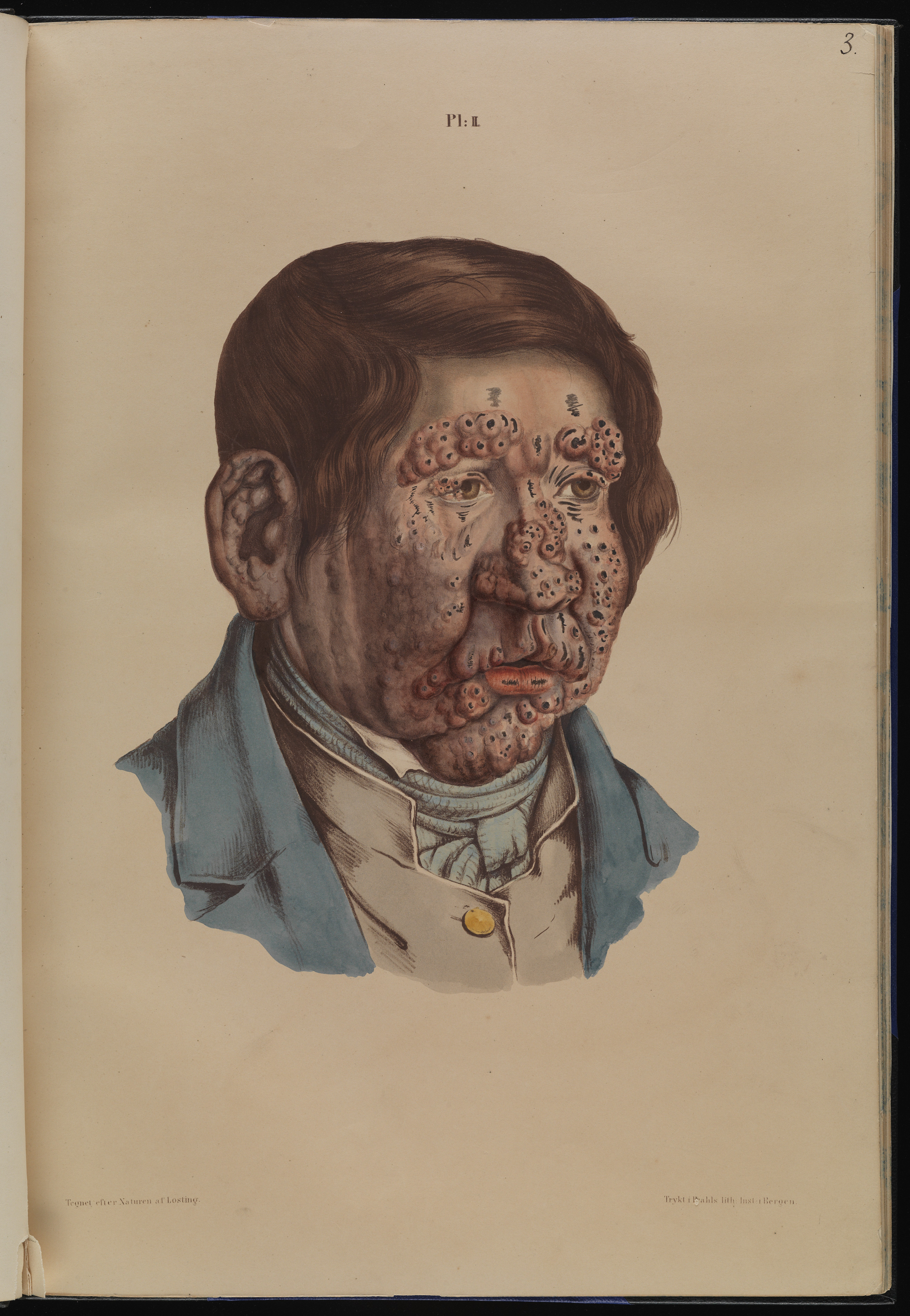
Depictions of a 26-year-old woman with leprous lesions and a 13-year-old boy with severe leprosy in Daniel Cornelius' 1847 Om Spedalskhed

Despite effective treatment and education efforts, leprosy stigma remains problematic in developing countries where the disease is common. Leprosy is most common amongst impoverished populations where social stigma is likely to be compounded by poverty. Fears of ostracism, job loss, or expulsion from family and society may contribute to a delayed diagnosis and treatment.

Folk beliefs, lack of education, and religious connotations of the disease continue to influence social perceptions of those affected in many parts of the world. In Brazil, for example, folklore holds that leprosy is a disease transmitted by dogs, or that it is associated with sexual promiscuity, or that it is a punishment for sins or moral transgressions (distinct from other diseases and misfortunes, which are in general thought of as being according to the will of God). Socioeconomic factors also have a direct impact. Lower-class domestic workers who are often employed by those in a higher socioeconomic class may find their employment in jeopardy as physical manifestations of the disease become apparent. Skin discoloration and darker pigmentation resulting from the disease also have social repercussions.

In extreme cases in northern India, leprosy is equated with an "untouchable" status that "often persists long after individuals with leprosy have been cured of the disease, creating lifelong prospects of divorce, eviction, loss of employment, and ostracism from family and social networks."

== Public policy ==
The World Health Organization maintains an Expert Committee on Leprosy since 1954, and a goal of the WHO is to "eliminate leprosy." In 2016 the organization launched "Global Leprosy Strategy 2016–2020: Accelerating towards a leprosy-free world". Elimination of leprosy is defined as "reducing the proportion of (people with) leprosy in the community to very low levels, specifically to below one case per 10,000 population". Diagnosis and treatment with multidrug therapy are effective, and a 45% decline in disease burden has occurred since MDT has become more widely available. The organization emphasizes the importance of fully integrating leprosy treatment into public health services, effective diagnosis and treatment, and access to information. The approach includes supporting an increase in health care professionals who understand the disease, and a coordinated and renewed political commitment that includes coordination between countries and improvements in the methodology for collecting and analysing data.

Interventions include:

- Early detection of cases focusing on children to reduce transmission and disabilities.
- Enhanced healthcare services and improved access for people who may be marginalized.
- For countries where leprosy is endemic, further interventions include improved screening of close contacts, improved treatment regimens, and interventions to reduce stigma and discrimination against people who have leprosy.

In some instances in India, community-based rehabilitation is embraced by local governments and NGOs alike. Often, the identity cultivated by a community environment is preferable to reintegration, and models of self-management and collective agency independent of NGOs and government support have been desirable and successful.

== Notable cases ==
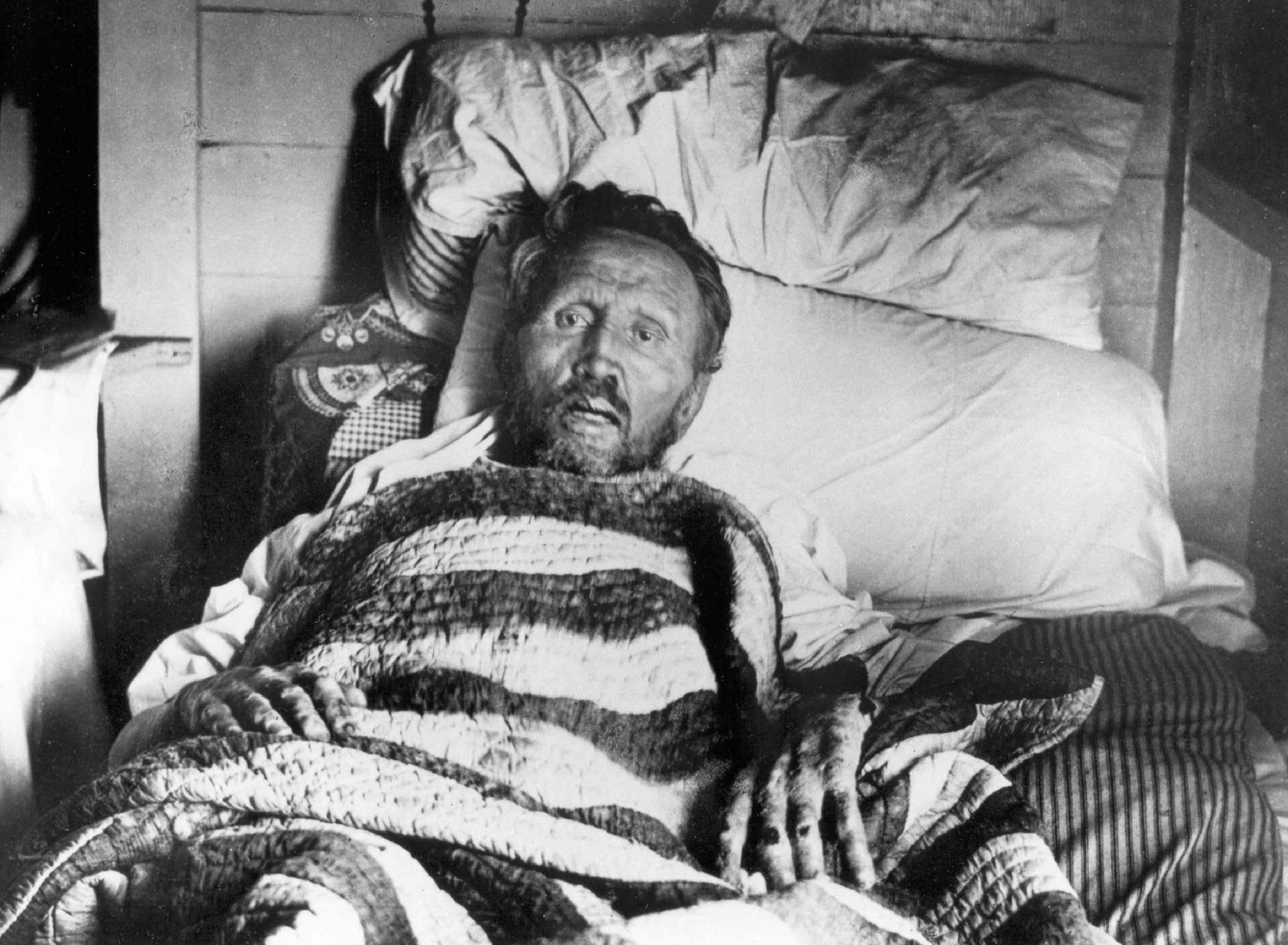
Father Damien on his deathbed on 14 April 1889

- Baldwin IV of Jerusalem (1161–1185), Catholic king of Latin Jerusalem, also known as the "Leper King".
- Henry IV of England (r. 1399–1413) possibly had leprosy.
- Ōtani Yoshitsugu (1558 or 1565–1600), a Japanese daimyō (feudal lord).
- Ingeborg Grytten (c. 1668 – after 1705), Norwegian writer whose leprosy is thought to have influenced her poetry, which is characterized by a strong religious faith in God's salvation.
- Saint Damien De Veuster (1840–1889), a Catholic priest from Belgium, contracted leprosy and ministered to lepers who had been placed under a government-sanctioned medical quarantine on Molokaʻi in the Kingdom of Hawaiʻi.
- Josephine Cafrine of Seychelles (1877–1907) had leprosy from age 12 and kept a journal that documented her struggles and suffering. It was published as an autobiography in 1923.
- British writer Peter Greave (1910–1977)
- Vietnamese poet Hàn Mặc Tử (1912–1940)
- Josefina Guerrero (1917–1996), Filipino World War II spy who used the Japanese fear of her leprosy to listen to their battle plans and deliver the information to the American forces under Douglas MacArthur.
- Hilarion Guia (1942–2016), Filipino educator who became the first mayor of Culion, Palawan which hosted the Culion leper colony.
- Dimple Kapadia (1957–present), Indian actress, was diagnosed with leprosy a few months before the shoot of the 1973 musical romance film Bobby. She later recovered completely and went on to have a successful acting career.

== In media ==
- August 1891—the short story collection Life's Handicap by Rudyard Kipling has a story "The Mark of the Beast" in which a traveller on horseback literally stumbles into a leper colony in India.
- 1909— Jack London published "Koolau the Leper" in his Tales of Hawaiʻi about Molokai and people consigned to it circa 1893.
- 1959—James Michener's novel Hawaii dramatizes Molokai's leper settlement, including Father Damien.
- 1959—Ben-Hur depicts the title character's mother, Miriam, and younger sister, Tirzah, are imprisoned by the Roman Empire. When they are freed years later, they have leprosy and leave town for the Valley of the Lepers, rather than stay and reunite with Ben-Hur. They leave the colony, and when Jesus dies on the cross, they are miraculously cured.
- 1960—English author Graham Greene's novel A Burnt-Out Case is set in a leper colony in Belgian Congo. The story is also predominantly about a disillusioned architect working with a doctor on devising new cures and amenities for mutilated victims of lepers; the title, too, refers to the condition of mutilation and disfigurement in the disease.
- 1962— Forugh Farrokhzad made a 22-minute documentary about a leprosy colony in Iran titled The House Is Black. The film humanizes the people affected and opens by saying that "there is no shortage of ugliness in the world, but by closing our eyes on ugliness, we will intensify it."
- 1977— The lead character in The Chronicles of Thomas Covenant by Stephen R. Donaldson suffers from leprosy. His condition seems to be cured by the magic of the fantasy land he finds himself in. He resists believing in its reality, for example, by continuing to perform a regular visual surveillance of extremities as a safety check. Donaldson gained experience with the disease as a young man in India, where his father worked in a missionary for people with leprosy.
- 1988—The death metal band Death releases their second album titled Leprosy, with a song also titled "Leprosy", the lyrics of which talk about the progressive decay the disease causes, and the social isolation placed upon people infected.
- 2006— Moloka'i is a novel by Alan Brennert about a leper colony in Hawaii. This novel follows the story of a seven-year-old girl taken from her family and put on Molokai's leper settlement.
- 2009— Squint: My Journey with Leprosy is a memoir by Jose P. Ramirez.
- 2026— The Leprosy Official Scenario is added to Plague Inc: Evolved in the 'Aliens and Anti-Vaxxers' Update.

== Infection of animals ==
Between 15 and 20% of Mexican long-nosed armadillos(Dasypus mexicanus) in the south-central United States carry M. leprae. As a result of their low body temperature, their tissues commonly contain massive numbers of organisms, which help in the dissemination of the infection. Armadillos were first demonstrated in 1971 to develop leprosy after inoculation with M. leprae. Because of armadillos' armor, skin lesions are difficult to ascertain. Abrasions around the eyes, nose, and feet are the most common signs. Infected armadillos make up a large reservoir of M. leprae. They may be a source of infection for some humans in the United States or other locations in the armadillos' home range. In armadillo leprosy, lesions do not persist at the site of entry in animals; M. leprae multiply in macrophages at the site of inoculation and lymph nodes.

Armadillos have been used in immunological research to fight leprosy. Some notable reagents include recombinant interleukin-2 and recombinant interferon-gamma reagents. Additionally, they have been key and have been useful models of leprosy for studies regarding neuropathy. In clinical procedures such as electrophysiological nerve conduction tests Armadillo's nerve function has been properly assessed. Despite the studies mentioned regarding Armadillo's relationship to neuropathy and other effects of leprosy, there is still a lack of proper study on armadillos, and in conducting more armadillo-specific regents, our understanding of leprosy's effects on armadillos and possibly, humans can be found. Armadillos are a key component of modern-day research on leprosy.

There is a stigma surrounding armadillos and the carrying of leprosy. Because many people do not understand armadillos very well, it is common for people to think of them as being dangerous to society and, as a result, valuing their lives less than other animals. It has become more common in parts of America for people to eat raw or undercooked armadillo, making the chances high that, if not properly handled with care, one may become infected.

An outbreak in chimpanzees in West Africa showed that the bacteria can infect another species and may have additional rodent hosts. Studies have demonstrated that the disease is endemic in the UK red Eurasian squirrel population, with M. leprae and M. lepromatosis appearing in different populations. The M. leprae strain discovered on Brownsea Island is equated to one thought to have died out in the human population in medieval times. Despite this, and speculation regarding past transmission through trade in squirrel furs, there does not seem to be a high risk of squirrel to human transmission from the wild population. Although leprosy continues to be diagnosed in immigrants to the UK, the last known human case of leprosy arising in the UK was recorded over 200 years ago.

It has been shown that leprosy can reprogram cells in mouse and armadillo models, similar to how induced pluripotent stem cells are generated by the transcription factors Myc, Oct3/4, Sox2, and Klf4. A notable study conducted by Charles Shepard used mice to find how leprosy, an infection that has a preference for cooler areas of the body, would work in a warm-blooded animal. The main findings were that even in mice whose immune systems were severely impaired and at a perceived high risk of developing leprosy, the body was still, in most cases, able to fight off leprosy. There are a few other up-and-coming models for M. leprae, including the use of other animals, such as mammals, birds, and cold-blooded animals. These animals do not tend to give as great results as armadillos and mice, as different animals have different levels of disease resistance.
