= Fernando Latapi =

José Diódoro Fernando Latapí (October 11, 1902 – October 28, 1989) was a Mexican dermatologist, teacher and author, as well as the founder of the Mexican Society of Dermatology, and the Mexican School of Leprology. He changed the way leprosy was perceived, classified different types of leprosy patients, and made important contributions to both syphilis and a disease called pinta.

== Life ==
Latapí was born to Fernando Latapí Rangel and Pilar Contreras Scheleski, baptized on November 4, 1902. His father was the owner of two toy shops "El Coliseo" and "El Globo" in Mexico City. His grandfather was born in Pau, Pyrénées-Atlantiques in the south of France, and his mother's family came from Tlacotalpan, Veracruz. Latapí look after his mother in appearance. He had two brothers, Victor and Alberto and a sister, Pilar. His first house was in Colonia Santa María la Ribera, Mexico City, a residential neighborhood. He was religious and attended church every Sunday.

As a child he was polite and kind-hearted. He loved flowers and always took special care for his dog, named "Tu Tu". He attended elementary school at Instituto Franco Inglés, and then went to the Nacional Preparatoria de la Universidad Nacional, where he studied medicine. After graduating from medical school on August 11, 1928, he was not originally interested in pursuing a career in dermatology. However, as it was the only vacant position at a local clinic, he started working in the field.

In 1934, he married his first wife, Esperanza Nieto, mentioned in his thesis as "the one who came to light up my life". Esperanza died in 1937 giving birth to a baby, which also died during childbirth. This event was caused by the use of forceps, which caused excessive bleeding. Four years later, Latapi married Clemencia Espinoza, which he met at a leprosy campaign. Clemencia remained Latapi's partner and collaborator throughout the years until Fernando's death in 1989. Although his wife and he loved children, they never had one on their own. Apart from his native language Spanish, he spoke French and English, and understood both Italian and Portuguese. The latter was especially useful when he worked in leprosy studies with physicians João Ramos e Silva from Brazil and Augusto Salazar Leite from Portugal. He enjoyed reading plays and listening to opera and classical music. He was also fond of theatre, but most of all, he liked going to the cinema, and during a long period of time he annually attended a film festival called "Muestra Internacional de Cine".

== Career ==
Latapí was one of the main founders and remained director of the Mexican Society of Dermatology for 45 years, until his death in 1982. When the Mexican Association of Action Against Leprosy (AMAL abbr. in Spanish) was founded in 1948, Fernando Latapí donated a few books and promoted the establishment of a library. Other books were added slowly and then Dr. Maximiliamo Obermayer, a Californian professor in dermatology donated his library. Today, with the contribution of important figures in dermatology as well as with books from the Mexican government, AMAL has one of the largest libraries in dermatology and leprology in Mexico.

On January 8, 1937, Fernando Latapí founded the Mexican School of Leprology that has as main goals the abolishment of drastic laws against people with leprosy, as well as the integral and respectful treatment towards them. Dr. Latapí contributed to the eradication of the traditional concept of leprosy, in which people that suffered from this condition were social misfits since people considered them impure and they thought leprosy was highly contagious. To change this misconception, he and his team crusaded for the training of medical personal in the disease. Later on, he and his team created brigades which diagnosed more than seven thousand patients in three years which was more people than what had been diagnosed in thirty years prior. At AMAL, he always promoted equal treatment for all patients, and he successfully treated most of them, giving a revolutionary twist to the history of this disease that had no cure before.

He also demonstrated that chaulmoogra oil, which at the time was thought to be an efficient treatment, was actually not beneficial, but harmful to the treatment of the disease. Instead, in 1944 he was the first one to use promin, as a treatment for leprosy in Mexico. He also made significant contributions for a disease called pinta, specifically about its diagnosis with early buds.

The AMAL Center of Leprosy served as a hospital for all cases of leprosy and some years later became a dermatological center, which is now Ladislao De La Pascua Dermatological Center. The center was founded by Dr. Latapí and strongly contributes to the role of teaching and qualification of personal in the Mexican dermatological area since successful specialists have studied there and have developed futures institutions based on the teachings of their alma mater.

Due to his contributions during his career, he received national and international recognition. In 1956 he organized the 3rd Ibero Latin-American Congress of dermatology as well as the 11th edition of the same one In 1960, he received the Gaspar Viana of CILAD, the highest award in the Mexican medicine. In 1978 he organized the XI International Congress of Leprosy. He also received the Damián Dutton award for his contributions in the field of leprology in 1978. He served as the president of the XI International Congress of Leprosy celebrated in Mexico in 1978 as well.

Fernando Latapí was the author of over three hundred papers along his career. Leprosy became his passion for 45 years, and the source behind his major medical contributions. He published a great deal of writings in medical magazines and journals. One of Latapí's passions was teaching, something he did for many years. He taught his students about health service, interaction with patients, kindness as well as academic content. He stated that someone giving a class or talking to a patient should guarantee that the listener laughed, or cried because it indicated trust in the doctor.

He made contributions to medicine such as being the first one to employ successfully sulphones for treatment of mycetomas and the proposal of the term "pintides" for the secondary lesions of pinta. He also discovered a previously unknown disease in 1956, calling it "dyschromia en confetti" which is caused by hydroquinones. Dr. Latapí also established terms such as "early" and "late" syphilis and corticoderma. He modified the Morgan scheme in syphilis and rediscovered necrotizing erythema that is also known as Lucio phenomenon. There is even a "Latapi Lepromatosis" which is a form of diffuse nonnodular lepromatous leprosy.
