= Nocardiosis in fish =

Bacterial disease

Nocardiosis in fish (also known as piscine nocardiosis) is a chronic bacterial disease affecting marine and freshwater fishes. The disease is characterized by the formation of granulomatous lesions in internal organs and is most commonly associated with species of Nocardia, particularly Nocardia seriolae. Nocardiosis has been reported in both wild and farmed fish populations and can cause significant mortality in aquaculture.

== Etiology ==
Fish nocardiosis is caused by aerobic, gram-positive bacteria belonging to the genus Nocardia. Members of the genus are characterized by filamentous growth and the presence of mycolic acids in their cell walls. Several species have been implicated in fish disease, including:

- Nocardia seriolae
- Nocardia asteroides
- Nocardia salmonicida

Among these, N. seriolae is responsible for the majority of reported outbreaks in aquaculture.

== Pathogenesis ==
Nocardiosis in fish is a chronic granulomatous disease. Infection is characterized by dissemination of bacteria throughout the internal organs and the formation of necrotizing granulomas.

=== Transmission ===
The transmission of Nocardia in fish is not fully understood. The pathogen likely enters through damagec skin, gills, or the gastrointestinal tract. Infected fish may serve as reservoirs of infection and transmission is believed to occur through exposure to contaminated water or infected tissues.

=== Pathogenesis ===
Following infection, Nocardia species can survive within host phagocytic cells and disseminate throughout the body. The bacteria induce a chronic inflammatory response characterized by the formation of granulomas. Granulomatous lesions commonly develop in the kidney, spleen, liver, and heart. As the infection progresses, these lesions may enlarge and interfere with normal organ function.

=== Signs and symptoms ===
Due to the chronic nature of the disease, clinical signs are difficult to notice during the early stages of infection. Visual signs of infection include sluggish swimming, emaciation, exophthalmia, and pectoral hemorrhages. Most fish infected with nocardiosis also show skin lesions, necrosis, and ulceration, especially at the fin base. Skin lesions may also be accompanied with blisters, that produce yellow pus when cut. These nodules are approximately 0.1-0.5 cm in size and can also be observed throughout all internal organs.

=== Diagnosis ===
Bacterial culture and isolation of Nocardia is considered the gold standard for the identification, speciation, and antimicrobial susceptibility testing for Nocardia. However, bacterial culture for nocardiosis in aquaculture has significant limitations. Bacterial culture has low sensitivity in diagnosing fish nocardiosis. A study found that Nocardia was only able to be isolated from 55% of fish nocardiosis. Additionally culture methods have long turn around times due to the slow growing nature of the pathogen.

Pulse-field gel electrophoresis (PFGE) has emerged as an effective diagnostic laboratory test in diagnosing nocardiosis.

=== Prevention ===
Good husbandry practices and maintaining water quality can help prevent against nocardiosis in aquaculture settings. Due to the rise of antibacterial resistance, considerable research is being conducted on alternative methods of preventing Nocardiosis. Supplementation of fish feed with probiotics is a one such method. One study reported that probiotic fermented herbs were effective at both preventing and treating experimentally infected fish.
