= Nocardia farcinica =

Scientific classification
- Domain: Bacteria
- Kingdom: Bacillati
- Phylum: Actinomycetota
- Class: Actinomycetes
- Order: Mycobacteriales
- Family: Nocardiaceae
- Genus: Nocardia
- Species: N. farcinica

Binomial name
- Nocardia farcinica Trevisan 1889 (Approved Lists 1980)

Type strain
- ATCC 3318; CCUG 10109; CCUG 27778; CCUG 48656; CIP 104775; DSM 43257; DSM 43578; DSM 43665; IEGM 621; IFO 15532; JCM 3088; M. Goodfellow N898/ATCC 3318; NBRC 15532; NCTC 11134; NRRL B-2089

Synonyms
- "Nocardia blackwellii" (Erikson 1935) Waksman and Henrici 1948

Species of bacterium

Nocardia farcinica is a species of gram-positive bacteria, once thought to be associated with farcy, and a member of the genus Nocardia. This species is very similar in phenotype to Nocardia asteroides, to the degree that some isolates of N. asteroides were later found to be Nocardia farcinica.

== Pathogenicity ==
N. farcinica may be a causative agent of nocardiosis or of secondary infections in immunocompromised patients. Strains of this species have been isolated from human brain abscesses.

== Genome ==
N. farcinica contains a 6 million base pair genome with an average GC content of 70.8%. A sequenced strain, IFM 10152, is also known to contain two plasmids, pNF1 pNF2. The chromosome encodes 5,674 potential protein-coding open reading frames. This genome may have undergone numerous gene duplication events as a result of adapting to new environments.
