= Amoxicillin/clavulanic acid =

Combination antibiotic medication

Combination of
- Amoxicillin: Penicillin antibiotic
- Clavulanic acid: Beta-lactamase inhibitor

Clinical data
- Trade names: Augmentin, Clavulin, Amoclan, others
- Other names: Co-amoxiclav; Amox-clav
- AHFS/Drugs.com: Monograph
- MedlinePlus: a685024
- License data: US DailyMed: Amoxicillin clavulanate
- Pregnancy category: AU: B1
- Routes of administration: By mouth, intravenous
- ATC code: J01CR02 (WHO) QJ01CR02 (WHO)

Legal status
- Legal status: AU: S4 (Prescription only); CA: ℞-only; UK: POM (Prescription only); US: ℞-only

Identifiers
- PubChem CID: 6435924
- ChemSpider: 4940608
- KEGG: D06485
- ChEMBL: ChEMBL1697738
- CompTox Dashboard (EPA): DTXSID40225477

Chemical and physical data
- Formula: C_{24}H_{27}KN_{4}O_{10}S
- Molar mass: 602.66 g·mol^{−1}
- 3D model (JSmol): Interactive image
- SMILES: CC1(C(N2C(S1)C(C2=O)NC(=O)C(C3=CC=C(C=C3)O)N)C(=O)O)C.C1C2N(C1=O)C(C(=CCO)O2)C(=O)[O-].[K+]
- InChI: InChI=DWHGNUUWCJZQHO-ZVDZYBSKSA-M; Key:1S/C16H19N3O5S.C8H9NO5.K/c1-16(2)11(15(23)24)19-13(22)10(14(19)25-16)18-12(21)9(17)7-3-5-8(20)6-4-7;10-2-1-4-7(8(12)13)9-5(11)3-6(9)14-4;/h3-6,9-11,14,20H,17H2,1-2H3,(H,18,21)(H,23,24);1,6-7,10H,2-3H2,(H,12,13);/q;;+1/p-1/b;4-1-;/t9-,10-,11+,14-;6-,7-;/m11./s1

Amoxicillin/clavulanic acid, also known as co-amoxiclav or amox-clav, sold under the brand names Augmentin, and Ranclav among others, is an antibiotic medication used for the treatment of a number of bacterial infections. It is a combination consisting of amoxicillin, a β-lactam antibiotic, and potassium clavulanate, a β-lactamase inhibitor. It is specifically used for otitis media, streptococcal pharyngitis, pneumonia, cellulitis, urinary tract infections, and animal bites. It can be administered orally or intravenously.

Common side effects include diarrhea, vomiting, and allergic reactions. It also increases the risk of yeast infections, headaches, and blood clotting problems. It is not recommended in people with a history of a penicillin allergy. It is relatively safe for use during pregnancy.

Amoxicillin/clavulanic acid was approved for medical use in the United States in 1984. It is on the World Health Organization's List of Essential Medicines. The World Health Organization classifies amoxicillin/clavulanic-acid as critically important for human medicine. It is available as a generic medication. In 2023, it was the 66th most commonly prescribed medication in the United States, with more than 9 million prescriptions.

== History ==
Amoxicillin/clavulanic acid is the International Nonproprietary Name (INN) for this two-drug combination; "co-amoxiclav" is the British Approved Name (BAN). British scientists working at Beecham (now part of GlaxoSmithKline) filed for U.K. patent protection for amoxicillin/clavulanic acid in 1977, which was granted in 1982. It was originally sold under the brand name Augmentin.

== Preparations ==
Branded products may indicate their strengths as the quantity of amoxicillin; Augmentin 250, for example, contains 250 mg of amoxicillin and 125 mg of clavulanic acid.

As of this date, suspensions of amoxicillin/clavulanic acid have been available for use in children, products which must be refrigerated to maintain effectiveness. Intravenous preparations have been available since 1985 (in the UK); no such parenteral preparation was, as of this date, available in the US. (The nearest equivalent is ampicillin/sulbactam.)

== Medical uses ==
=== Overview ===
As of 2010, when susceptible bacteria are implicated, amoxicillin/clavulanic acid has been widely used to prevent infections, e.g., in

- surgical chemoprophylaxis;

or to treat ongoing infections, including:

- urinary tract infections;
- respiratory tract infections;
- skin and soft tissue infections (SSTIs);
- mixed Gram-negative, Gram-positive, and anaerobic infections:
  - of the foot, associated with diabetes;
  - in lung abscesses;
  - in empyema;
  - in peritonitis;
  - in post-operative obstetric/gynocologic cases;
  - in "intra-abdominal collections";
- infections caused by animal and human bites (including human "fight bite" wounds),
- in cases of chemotherapy-related fever and neutropenia (at low risk);
- Burkholderia pseudomallei melioidosis (first-line pediatric/pregnancy, second-line adult);
- as an anti-mycobacterial component option in multi-resistant tuberculosis;
- as a second-line for nocardiosis assigned to Nocardia brasiliensis, and as possible option for other cases;
- after ceftriaxone/cefixime, as an alternative, as a co-therapy against penicillin-sensitive or beta-lactamase positive gonorrhoea;
- in chancroid due to multi-resistant Haemophilus ducreyi;
- after metronidazole and clindamycin, as an option against bacterial vaginosis;
- dental infections associated with oral bacteria,
- Sinus infections;
- Tonsillitis;
- cat scratches; and
- Diverticulitis.

=== Urinary tract infections ===
Amoxicillin/clavulanic acid is a second-line therapy in the treatment of uncomplicated urinary tract infections (UTIs). It is active against UTIs caused by Staphylococcus saprophyticus, Enterococci (e.g., Enterococcus faecalis), Escherichia coli, Klebsiella pneumoniae, and Proteus mirabilis. It is a definitive treatment against susceptible extended-spectrum β-lactamase (ESBL)-producing Gram-negative bacteria. The drug is not effective against Pseudomonas aeruginosa, Morganella morganii, or Providencia stuartii, nor against AmpC β-lactamase- and ESBL-producing Gram-negative bacteria or carbapenem-resistant Enterobacteriaceae (CRE). It is not recommended in the empiric treatment of acute pyelonephritis or hospital-acquired UTIs.

As determined by a 2014 literature review of antibiotics for UTIs, respective early clinical cure and early bacterial cure rates were 91% and 91% for trimethoprim/sulfamethoxazole, 92% and 87% for nitrofurantoin, 91% and 83% for fosfomycin, 90% and 91% for fluoroquinolones (ciprofloxacin and norfloxacin), and 86% and 81% for β-lactams (amoxicillin/clavulanic acid and cefpodoxime). In a large high-quality randomized controlled trial of amoxicillin/clavulanic acid for UTI in 370 women, early and late clinical cure rates were 79% and 58%, respectively. Amoxicillin/clavulanic acid reaches a relatively low urine concentration, which might be involved in its lower effectiveness than other antibiotics.

Amoxicillin/clavulanic acid is less effective in the treatment of UTI than first-line therapies used to treat UTIs. A 2012 network meta-analysis of antibiotics for uncomplicated UTIs found that it was less effective than all other assessed agents, including trimethoprim/sulfamethoxazole, nitrofurantoin, fosfomycin, fluoroquinolones (ciprofloxacin, norfloxacin, and gatifloxacin), and pivmecillinam. However, selection of an empirical antibiotic should be based on local or regional susceptibility data. Additionally, selection of the most appropriate and narrowest effective antibiotic is recommended to help limit increased antibiotic resistance to broad-spectrum antibiotics.

Combining amoxicillin/clavulanic acid with aztreonam can further enhance its activity against certain resistant UTI-causing bacteria.

=== Tuberculosis ===
It is also used for tuberculosis that is resistant to other treatments. The World Health Organization recommends giving amoxicillin-clavulanate along with meropenem as one of the therapeutic options in drug-resistant tuberculosis. However, across the spectrum of dosage of amoxicillin-clavulanate combination, the dose of clavulanate is constant at 125 mg, whereas the dose of amoxicillin varies at 250 mg, 500 mg and 875 mg. Thus the use of low-dose amoxicillin-clavulanate in combination with meropenem may be used in part of a treatment regimen for drug-resistant TB and this has been demonstrated in a clinical setting also. Its efficacy is attributed not to the amoxicillin component, but to the protective action of clavulanic acid over meropenem against beta-lactamase produced by the mycobacteria. Therefore, the minimum dosage of amoxicillin (250 mg) is recommended.

== Pharmacology ==
Amoxicillin is an antibiotic of the penicillin family, while clavulanic acid is a non-antibiotic β-lactamase inhibitor that prevents inactivation of penicillins by certain resistant bacteria.

=== Adverse effects ===
Possible side effects include diarrhea, vomiting, nausea, thrush, and skin rash. These do not usually require medical attention. As with all antimicrobial agents, antibiotic-associated diarrhea due to Clostridioides difficile infection—sometimes leading to pseudomembranous colitis—may occur during or after treatment with amoxicillin/clavulanic acid.

Rarely, cholestatic jaundice (also referred to as cholestatic hepatitis, a form of liver toxicity) has been associated with amoxicillin/clavulanic acid. The reaction may occur up to several weeks after treatment has stopped and usually takes weeks to resolve. It is more frequent in men, older people, and those who have taken long courses of treatment; the estimated overall incidence is one in 100,000 exposures. In the United Kingdom, co-amoxiclav carries a warning from the Committee on Safety of Medicines to this effect.

As all aminopenicillins, amoxicillin has been associated with Stevens–Johnson syndrome / toxic epidermal necrolysis, although these reactions are very rare.

== Veterinary use ==
As stated by the FDA in its update tables to its "Approved Animal Drug Products" (Green Book), amoxicillin/clavulanic acid was, as of April 2024, being used in veterinary practice for a variety of conditions, including, for instance, in dogs, for

[s]kin and soft tissue infections such as wounds, abscesses, cellulitis, superficial/juvenile and deep pyoderma due to susceptible strains of the following organisms: β-lactamase-producing Staphylococcus aureus, non-β-lactamase-producing Staphylococcus aureus, Staphylococcus spp., Streptococcus spp., and E. coli; and periodontal infections due to susceptible strains of both aerobic and anaerobic bacteria [emphasis added],

and in cats, for

[s]kin and soft tissue infections such as wounds, abscesses, and cellulitis/dermatitis due to susceptible strains of the following organisms: β-lactamase-producing Staphylococcus aureus, non-β-lactamase-producing Staphylococcus aureus, Staphylococcus spp., Streptococcus spp., E. coli, and Pasteurella spp; urinary tract infections (cystitis) due to susceptible strains of E. coli [emphasis added].

== Miscellaneous research ==
In addition to its β-lactamase inhibition, clavulanic acid has been shown, in primary research studies, to have central nervous system bioactivities, and these actions and effects have been considered as potential treatment strategies for various psychiatric and neurological disorders; while in the decade from 2010-2019, it was discussed as an emerging drug for major depressive disorder and erectile dysfunction, more recent reports suggest these developments have been discontinued.
