= List of bacteria of South Africa =

This is an alphabetical list of the bacterial taxa recorded from South Africa.

== A ==
Family: Actinomycetaceae

Genus: Actinomyces Harz 1877

- Actinomyces africanus Nannizzi
- Actinomyces bovis Harz
- Actinomyces chromogenus Gasp
- Actinomyces dermatonomus Bull
- Actinomyces foulertoni Sartory & Bailly
- Actinomyces leishmani Sartory & Bailly
- Actinomyces leishmanii Erikson
- Actinomyces madurae Lachner-Sandoval
- Actinomyces mineaceus Lachner-Sandoval
- Actinomyces pijperi Sartory & Bailly
- Actinomyces pretorianus Nannizzi
- Actinomyces ruber Sartory & Bailly
- Actinomyces scabies Güssow
- Actinomyces transvalensis Nannizzi
- Actinomyces sp.

== N ==
Genus: Nocardia

- Nocardia africana Pijper & Pullinger.
- Nocardia foulertoni Chalmers & Christoph.
- Nocardia indica Chalmers & Christopherson.
- Nocardia pijperi Castellani & Chaim.
- Nocardia pretoriana Pijper & Pullinger.
- Nocardia transvalensis Pijper & Pull.
- Nocardia sp.
