= Nocardia alni =

Scientific classification
- Domain: Bacteria
- Kingdom: Bacillati
- Phylum: Actinomycetota
- Class: Actinomycetes
- Order: Mycobacteriales
- Family: Nocardiaceae
- Genus: Nocardia
- Species: N. alni

Binomial name
- Nocardia alni Nouioui et al. 2022

Type strain
- CECT 30122; DSM 110931 ncl2

Species of bacterium

Nocardia alni is a species of bacteria from the genus Nocardia that has been isolated from the root nodules of Alnus glutinosa.
