= Rhodococcus cerastii =

Scientific classification
- Domain: Bacteria
- Kingdom: Bacillati
- Phylum: Actinomycetota
- Class: Actinomycetes
- Order: Mycobacteriales
- Family: Nocardiaceae
- Genus: Rhodococcus
- Species: R. cerastii

Binomial name
- Rhodococcus cerastii Kämpfer et al., 2013

Plant and soil bacteria

Rhodococcus cerastii is a Gram-positive, rod-shaped bacteria of the family Nocardiaceae. Colonies appear circular in form, convex in elevation, and pale yellow in color when grown on tryptic soy agar (TSA).

It is a typical component of soil ecosystems where it has been successfully isolated from both soil and the surface of Cerastium holosteoides (the common mouse-ear chickweed) leaves. When incubated in tryptic soy broth, these aerobic rods exhibit optimal growth conditions of 30 °C (86 °F), a pH between 7–8, and 2–3% sodium chloride ($\ce{NaCl}$). However, there has been successful growth present within the following ranges: 15–50 °C (59–122 °F), pH 6.5-10.5, and 1-6% $\ce{NaCl}$

Notably, most research on R. cerastii focuses on the bacterial responses and adaptations to ibuprofen-related stressors. Specifically, a study conducted by Tyumina et al. found that R. cerastii moderately degraded the NSAID with patterns of increased metabolic activity and initially decreased catalase activity. Subsequent morphometric analysis found changes in size, shape, and surface roughness in directly exposed bacteria. Ibuprofen-treated R. cerastii samples exhibited lipid inclusions, polyphosphate granules, and intracellular membrane-like structures. Similarly, another study by Ivshina et al.proved that R. cerastii possesses a notably high ibuprofen tolerance with a promising potential for the biodegradation of ibuprofen under cometabolic conditions. Exposed samples commonly showed the formation of loose, needle-like, pale yellow aggregates.
