= Alanine carboxypeptidase =

Identifiers
- EC no.: 3.4.17.6
- CAS no.: 37288-70-3

Databases
- IntEnz: IntEnz view
- BRENDA: BRENDA entry
- ExPASy: NiceZyme view
- KEGG: KEGG entry
- MetaCyc: metabolic pathway
- PRIAM: profile
- PDB structures: RCSB PDB PDBe PDBsum
Search
- PMC: articles
- PubMed: articles
- NCBI: proteins

Alanine carboxypeptidase (EC 3.4.17.6, N-benzoyl-L-alanine-amidohydrolase) is an enzyme. This enzyme catalyses the following chemical reaction

Release of a C-terminal alanine from a peptide or a variety of pteroyl or acyl groups

This enzyme is isolated from soil bacteria. The enzyme from Corynebacterium equi also hydrolyses N-benzoylglycine and N-benzoyl-L-aminobutyric acid.
