= Nocardia ignorata =

Scientific classification
- Domain: Bacteria
- Kingdom: Bacillati
- Phylum: Actinomycetota
- Class: Actinomycetes
- Order: Mycobacteriales
- Family: Nocardiaceae
- Genus: Nocardia
- Species: N. ignorata

Binomial name
- Nocardia ignorata Yassin et al. 2001

Species of bacterium

Nocardia ignorata is a species of bacteria and a member of the genus Nocardia. Its type strain is IMMIB R-1434^{T} (= DSM 44496^{T} = NRRL B-24141^{T}).
