= Rhodococcus opacus =

Scientific classification
- Domain: Bacteria
- Kingdom: Bacillati
- Phylum: Actinomycetota
- Class: Actinomycetes
- Order: Mycobacteriales
- Family: Nocardiaceae
- Genus: Rhodococcus
- Species: R. opacus

Binomial name
- Rhodococcus opacus Klatte et al. 1995

Species of bacterium

Rhodococcus opacus is a bacterium species in the genus Rhodococcus. It is moderately chemolithotrophic. Its genome has been sequenced. R. opacus possesses extensive catabolic pathways for both sugars and aromatics and can tolerate inhibitory compounds found in depolymerized biomass (e.g., phenolics and furfural)
