= CYP123 family =

Group of cytochrome P450 enzymes

Cytochrome P450, family 123, also known as CYP123, is a cytochrome P450 monooxygenase family in bacteria. The first gene in this family to identify function is CYP123A9 from Rhodococcus sp, which catalysis estrone to 16-hydroxyestrone in the estradiol degradation pathway of bacteria.
