= Nocardia seriolae =

Scientific classification
- Domain: Bacteria
- Kingdom: Bacillati
- Phylum: Actinomycetota
- Class: Actinomycetes
- Order: Mycobacteriales
- Family: Nocardiaceae
- Genus: Nocardia
- Species: N. seriolae

Binomial name
- Nocardia seriolae Kudo et al., 1988

Species of bacterium

Nocardia seriolae is a species of gram-positive, partially acid-fast, branching filamentous bacterium from the order Mycobacteriales that causes piscine nocardiosis, a chronic granulomatous disease affecting marine and freshwater fish. This species is considered an important aquaculture pathogen and has been associated with significant economic losses in fish farming throughout Asia and the Americas.

== Taxonomy ==
Nocardia seriolae was first associated with disease outbreaks in farmed yellowtail (Seriola quinqueradiata) in Japan in the 1960s. Early investigators proposed the name Nocardia kampachi for the causative organism, although the description was based primarily on morphological observations and did not include designation of a type strain.

The proposed species, N. kampachi, was never validly published, and the original strains were eventually lost. Additional bacterial isolates recovered from infected yellowtail in the early 1970s by Kusuda were designated as N. kampachi.

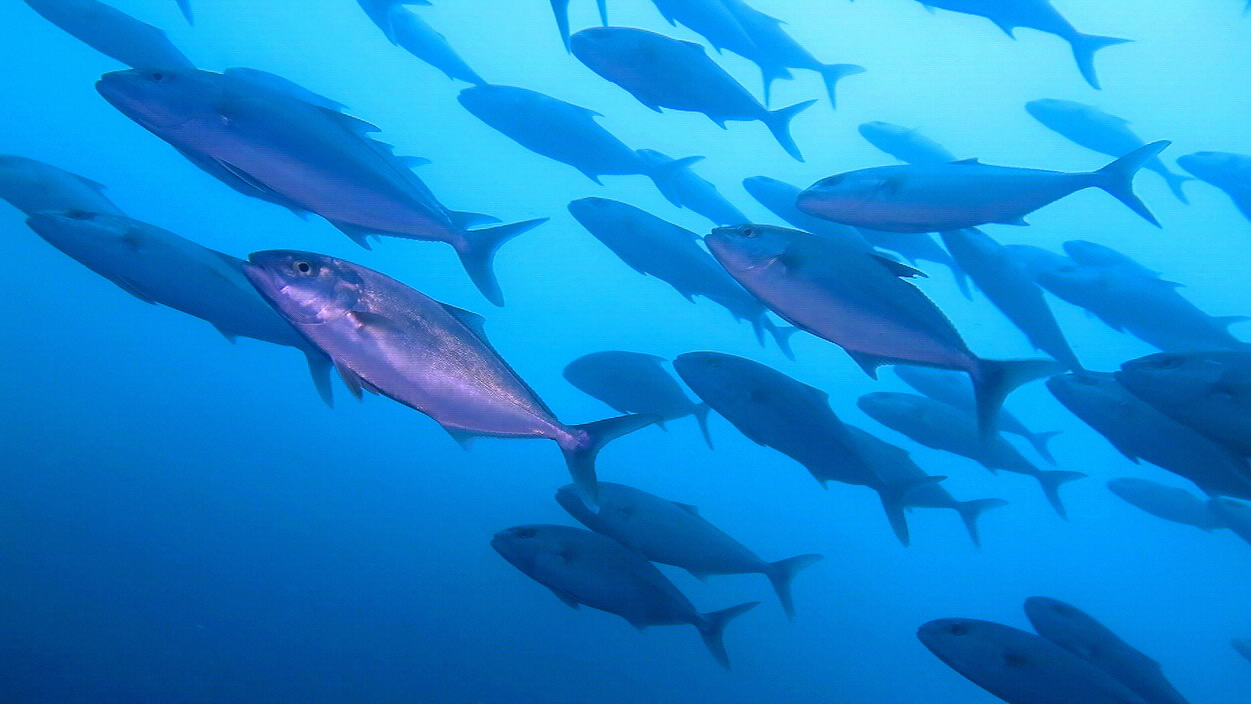
Yellowtail (Seriola quinqueradiata), the marine fish species in which Nocardia seriolae was first identified

In 1988 researchers examined Kusuda's isolates and four newly isolated strains recovered from infected yellow tail and Japanese flounder. Based on morphological and chemotaxonomic characteristics, the isolates were assigned to the genus Nocardia. The novel species Nocardia seriolae was proposed on the basis of DNA-DNA hybridization analyses, mycolic acid and fatty acid profiles, and physiological and biochemical characteristics that differentiated the species from previously described Nocardia species.

== Phenotypic characteristics ==
=== Morphology ===
Nocardia seriolae is a gram-positive, branching filamentous bacterium that demonstrates partial acid-fastness with Ziehl-Neelsen staining due to the presence of mycolic acids within the cell wall. Microscopically, the organism forms filamentous branching rods that may fragment into bacillary or coccoid elements.

=== Culture characteristics ===
Nocardia seriolae can be grown aerobically on various enriched laboratory media including brain heart infusion (BHI) agar, Ogawa agar, or sheep blood agar. Colonies are chalky, white and non-hemolytic on sheep blood agar. Colonies may appear yellowish orange on yeast extract-malt extract agar. Macroscopic aerial hyphae not formed: however, microscopic aerial hyphae are produced by some strains. Supplementation of laboratory media with NaCl may increase yield for marine isolates.

Growth is relatively slow compared to many aquatic bacterial pathogens and may require several days before characteristic colonies develop.

=== Biochemical characteristics ===
Nocardia seriolae shares several biochemical characteristics with Nocardia asteroides in many aspects including degradation of purines (adenine, xanthine, and hypoxanthine) and casein. Both are also able to ferment similar carbohydrates and utilize similar organic acids. Nocardia seriolae can be differented by its inability to produce urease, grow at warmer temperatures, and survive at 50 °C for 8 hours.

== Genomics ==
Comparative genomic studies have demonstrated that Nocardia seriolae possesses a relatively conserved genome with little genetic diversity among geographically related outbreak strains. The genomes ranged from approximately 7.55 to 7.96 Mbp with a G+C content of approximately 68.2 to 68.3%. The N. seriolae genome encodes approximately 7,600-8000 predicted proteins, many of which are classified as hypothetical proteins with unknown functions. The bacterium possess multiple putative virulence-associated genes involved in adherence, intracellular survival, invasion, nutrient acquisition, resistance to antibiotics and toxic compounds, and hemolysin biosynthesis.

Several CRISPR arrays lacking adjacent cas genes have additionally been identified within N. seriolae genomes, although their biological role and significance remains unclear.

== Pathogenesis and virulence ==
=== Infection process ===
Nocardia seriolae causes a chronic granulomatous disease in fish commonly referred to as nocardiosis. Infection is characterized by progressive dissemination through multiple internal organs and the formation of necrotizing granulomas. This species infects fish through the gills, anus, or surface injury.

Experimental infection in largemouth bass demonstrated that the bacterium initially colonizes the head kidney, heart, and trunk kidney during the early latent stage of infection before spreading to the spleen and liver during later stages. The head kidney was identified as the earliest and most severely affected tissues, suggesting that it serves as a primary target organ during systemic dissemination.

=== Granuloma formation ===
Granulomatous inflammation is considered a hallmark lesion of N. seriolae infection. Granulomas are highly organized spherical structures that are formed from an aggregation of cells including macrophages, dendritic cells, and granulocytes. They are an important immune response against early stages of N. seriolae infection. Granuloma formation due to N. seriolae infection may impair drug penetration and provide a protective environment for bacterial survival, potentially decreasing the effectiveness of antimicrobial therapy.

=== Intracellular survival and immune response ===
Like other members of the genus Nocardia, N. seriolae is capable of intracellular survival within macrophages. N. seriolae induces macrophage apoptosis in the early stages of infection and inhibits the process in the later stages of infection. The bacterium is able to modulate the host immune response through increasing expression of apoptosis-related proteins including Bax, cytochrome c, caspase-3, caspase-8, and caspase-9 during early infection before reducing them at later time points. Additionally, N. seriolae is able to avoid oxidative killing by the phagocyte through inhibition of reactive oxygen species production.

== Identification ==
Identification of Nocardia seriolae traditionally relies on colony morphology, histopathology, Ziehl-Neelsen staining, biochemical testing, and 16S rRNA gene sequencing. A quantitative PCR (qPCR) assay, based on 16sRNA sequence, has been used for the quantiative detection of N. seriolae in fish tissues, water samples, feeds, and oils. The gyrB gene has been proposed as a potentially superior target for the differentiation of Nocardia species, due to its higher degree of variation in comparison to 16S rRNA.

A duplex PCR assay has been validated for the identification of N. seriolae in largemouth bass. This study found the head kidney as the most reliable tissues for early molecular detection of infection before extensive granuloma formation became apparent histologically.

== Aquaculture ==
Nocardia seriolae is regarded as an important aquaculture pathogen in regions with intensive marine and freshwater fish production, particularly in Malaysia, China, Singapore, Vietnam, and Indonesia. The disease has been associated with severe economic losses due to mortality, reduced growth rates, and treatment costs. An estimated 260 tonnes of cultured yellowtail were lost in 1989 as a result of disease outbreaks. N. seriolae infection in farmed fish have a morbidity rate between 15 and 30%. In some instances, it can be as high as 60%, and the mortality rate in experimentally induced models can reach 90-100%.

Nocardia seriolae has been isolated from a variety of farmed fish including yellowtail, orange-spotted grouper (Epinephelus coioides), Northern snakehead (Channa argus), Japanese eel (Anguilla japonica), snubnose pompano (Trachinotus blochii), spotted scat (Scatophagus argus), Jade perch (Scortum barcoo), spotted sea bass (Lateolabrax maculatus),

=== Signs and symptoms ===
Infected fish may present with skin ulcerations and white nodules in visceral organs.

=== Treatment ===
Treatment of N. seriolae infection in fish is difficult due to the chronic intracellular nature of the pathogen. Early diagnosis of the disease is difficult due to its insidious onset and minimal external signs of infection in the early stages of the disease.

Antimicrobials including tetracyclines, sulfonamides, and β-lactam antibiotics have been used in aquaculture settings with variable success.

Several Chinese herbal medicines have been demonstrated experimentally to have antibacterial effects on N. seriolae. In experimental infections of largemouth bass, Chinese sumac (Rhus chinensis) and Chinese skullcap (Scutellaria baicalensis) demonstrated antibacterial properties against N. seriolae.

=== Prevention ===
Preventative measures primarily focus on biosecurity, reduction of stocking stress, surveillance of broodstock and fingerlings, rapid removal of infected fish, and molecular monitoring of outbreak strains.

Genomic selection and selective breeding has been experimentally demonstrated to improve resistance to N. seriolae infection in spotted sea bass.

Probiotics are also being researched as an alternative preventative measure against nocardiosis. A study found that the bacterium Bacillus amyloliquefaciens has antibacterial activity against N. seriolae infection and that colonization may be protective against the N. seriolae.
