= (+)-Camphor 6-endo-hydroxylase =

Class of enzymes

Identifiers
- EC no.: 1.14.15.10

Databases
- IntEnz: IntEnz view
- BRENDA: BRENDA entry
- ExPASy: NiceZyme view
- KEGG: KEGG entry
- MetaCyc: metabolic pathway
- PRIAM: profile
- PDB structures: RCSB PDB PDBe PDBsum
Search
- PMC: articles
- PubMed: articles
- NCBI: proteins

(+)-Camphor 6-endo-hydroxylase (EC 1.14.15.10, P450camr) is an enzyme with systematic name (+)-camphor, reduced putidaredoxin:oxygen oxidoreductase (6-endo-hydroxylating). This enzyme catalyses the following chemical reaction

(+)-camphor + reduced putidaredoxin + O_{2} $\rightleftharpoons$ (+)-6-endo-hydroxycamphor + oxidized putidaredoxin + H_{2}O

Camphor 6-endo-hydroxylase is a cytochrome P450 monooxygenase from the bacterium Rhodococcus sp. NCIMB 9784.
