= Limonene-1,2-diol dehydrogenase =

Identifiers
- EC no.: 1.1.1.297

Databases
- IntEnz: IntEnz view
- BRENDA: BRENDA entry
- ExPASy: NiceZyme view
- KEGG: KEGG entry
- MetaCyc: metabolic pathway
- PRIAM: profile
- PDB structures: RCSB PDB PDBe PDBsum
Search
- PMC: articles
- PubMed: articles
- NCBI: proteins

Limonene-1,2-diol dehydrogenase (EC 1.1.1.297, NAD^{+}-dependent limonene-1,2-diol dehydrogenase) is an enzyme with systematic name menth-8-ene-1,2-diol:NAD^{+} oxidoreductase. This enzyme catalyses the following chemical reaction

menth-8-ene-1,2-diol + NAD^{+} $\rightleftharpoons$ 1-hydroxymenth-8-en-2-one + NADH + H^{+} (general reaction)
(1) (1S,2S,4R)-menth-8-ene-1,2-diol + NAD^{+} $\rightleftharpoons$ (1S,4R)-1-hydroxymenth-8-en-2-one + NADH + H^{+}
(2) (1R,2R,4S)-menth-8-ene-1,2-diol + NAD^{+} $\rightleftharpoons$ (1R,4S)-1-hydroxymenth-8-en-2-one + NADH + H^{+}

While the enzyme from the Gram-positive bacterium Rhodococcus erythropolis DCL14 can use both (1S,2S,4R)- and (1R,2R,4S)-menth-8-ene-1,2-diol as substrate, activity is higher with (1S,2S,4R)-menth-8-ene-1,2-diol as substrate.

(+)-8-p-menthene-1,2-diol
+ NAD^{+}
H^{+}
H^{+}
(1S,4R)-1-hydroxylimonen-2-one
+ NADH
