= Cord factor =

Identifiers
CAS Number	61512-20-7
3D model (JSmol)	Interactive image
ChemSpider	397861
PubChem CID	451713
- InChI: InChI=1S/C130H250O15/c1-5-9-13-17-21-25-29-33-37-41-43-45-47-49-51-53-57-61-65-71-81-89-97-105-117(131)116(104-96-88-80-74-73-78-86-94-102-114-108-112(114)100-92-84-76-68-63-59-55-40-36-32-28-24-20-16-12-8-4)128(140)142-110-120-122(134)124(136)126(138)130(144-120)145-129-125(137)123(135)121(133)119(143-129)109-141-127(139)115(103-95-87-79-70-64-60-56-52-50-48-46-44-42-38-34-30-26-22-18-14-10-6-2)118(132)106-98-90-82-72-66-69-77-85-93-101-113-107-111(113)99-91-83-75-67-62-58-54-39-35-31-27-23-19-15-11-7-3/h111-126,129-138H,5-110H2,1-4H3 Key: DJUMKUNMJWRLAX-UHFFFAOYSA-N
- SMILES: CCCCCCCCCCCCCCCCCCCCCCCCCC(C(CCCCCCCCCCC1CC1CCCCCCCCCCCCCCCCCC)C(=O)OCC2C(C(C(C(O2)OC3C(C(C(C(O3)COC(=O)C(CCCCCCCCCCCCCCCCCCCCCCCC)C(CCCCCCCCCCCC4CC4CCCCCCCCCCCCCCCCCC)O)O)O)O)O)O)O)O

Properties
Chemical formula	C_{130}H_{250}O_{15}
Molar mass	2053.415 g·mol^{−1}
- Except where otherwise noted, data are given for materials in their standard state (at 25 °C [77 °F], 100 kPa). verify (what is ?) Infobox references

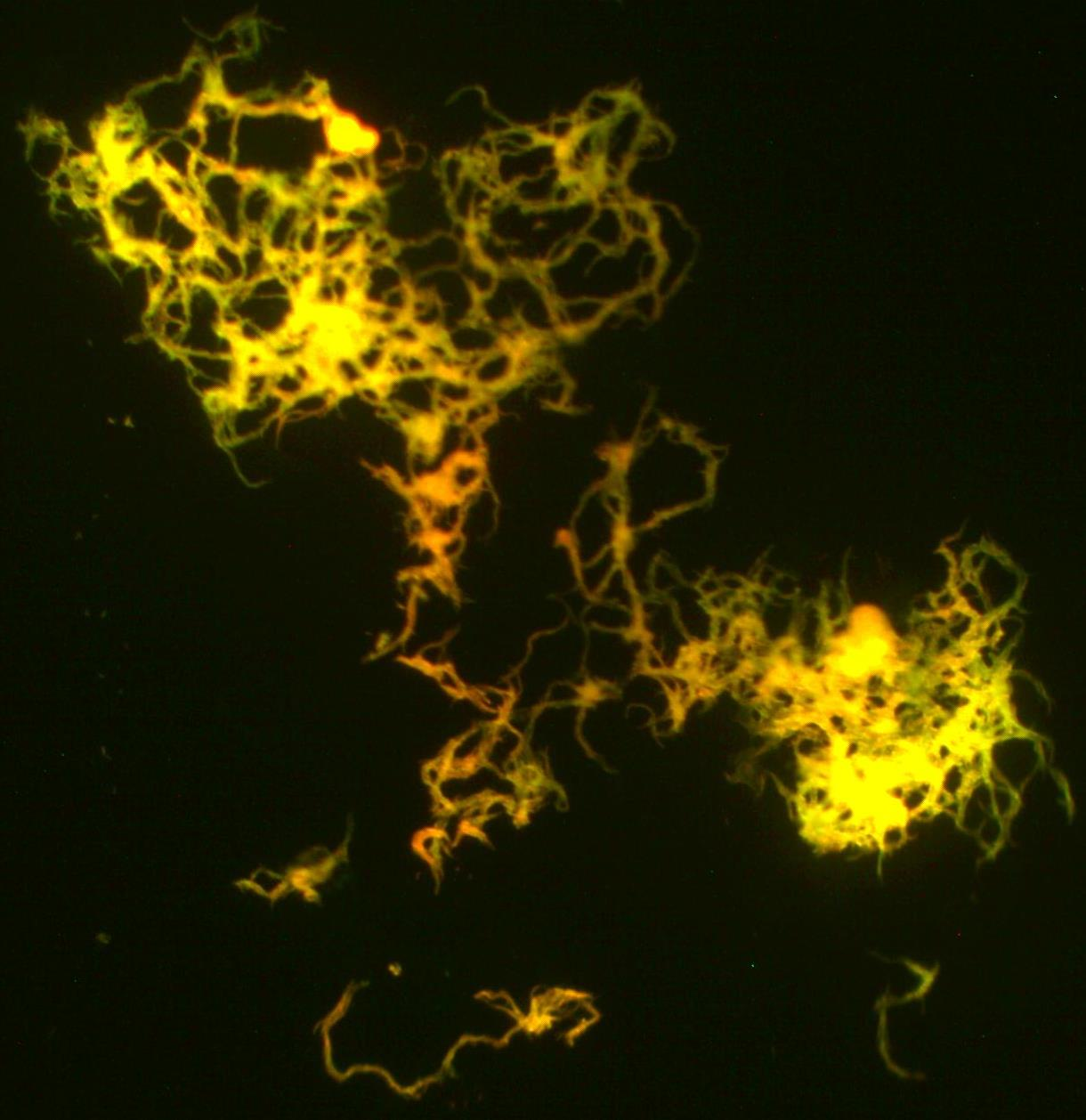
Cording Mycobacterium tuberculosis (H37Rv strain) viewed with fluorescent microscopy

Cord factor, or trehalose dimycolate (TDM), is a glycolipid molecule found in the cell wall of Mycobacterium tuberculosis and similar species. It is the primary lipid found on the exterior of M. tuberculosis cells. Cord factor influences the arrangement of M. tuberculosis cells into long and slender formations, giving its name. Cord factor is virulent towards mammalian cells and critical for survival of M. tuberculosis in hosts, but not outside of hosts. Cord factor has been observed to influence immune responses, induce the formation of granulomas, and inhibit tumor growth. The antimycobacterial drug SQ109 is thought to inhibit TDM production levels and in this way disrupts its cell wall assembly.

== Structure ==
A cord factor molecule is composed of a sugar molecule, trehalose (a disaccharide), composed of two glucose molecules linked together. Trehalose is esterified to two mycolic acid residues. One of the two mycolic acid residues is attached to the sixth carbon of one glucose, while the other mycolic acid residue is attached to the sixth carbon of the other glucose. Therefore, cord factor is also named trehalose-6,6'-dimycolate. The carbon chain of the mycolic acid residues vary in length depending on the species of bacteria it is found in, but the general range is 20 to 80 carbon atoms. Cord factor's amphiphilic nature leads to varying structures when many cord factor molecules are in close proximity. On a hydrophobic surface, they spontaneously form a crystalline monolayer. This crystalline monolayer is extremely durable and firm; it is stronger than any other amphiphile found in biology. This monolayer also forms in oil-water, plastic-water, and air-water surfaces. In an aqueous environment free of hydrophobic surfaces, cord factor forms a micelle. Furthermore, cord factor interlocks with lipoarabinomannan (LAM), which is found on the surface of M. tuberculosis cells as well, to form an asymmetrical bilayer. These properties cause bacteria that produce cord factor to grow into long, intertwining filaments, giving them a rope- or cord-like appearance when stained and viewed through a microscope (hence the name).

== Evidence of virulence ==
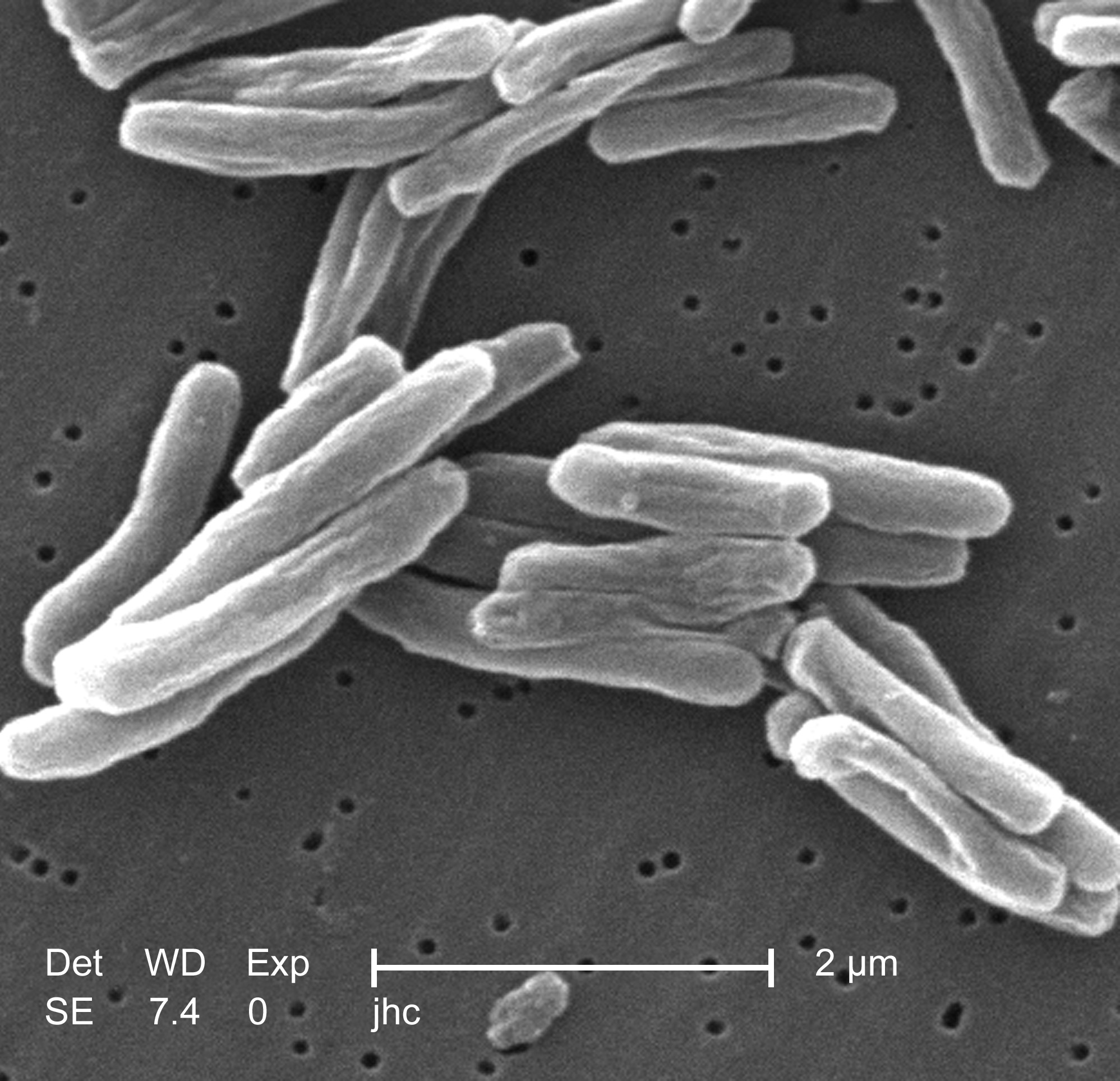
Scanning electron micrograph of Mycobacterium tuberculosis

A large quantity of cord factor is found in virulent M. tuberculosis, but not in avirulent M. tuberculosis. Furthermore, M. tuberculosis loses its virulence if its ability to produce cord factor molecules is compromised. Consequently, when all lipids are removed from the exterior of M. tuberculosis cells, the survival of the bacteria is reduced within a host. When cord factor is added back to those cells, M. tuberculosis survives at a rate similar to that of its original state. Cord factor increases the virulence of tuberculosis in mice, but it has minimal effect on other infections.

== Biological function ==
The function of cord factor is highly dependent on what environment it is located, and therefore its conformation. This is evident as cord factor is harmful when injected with an oil solution, but not when it is with a saline solution, even in very large amounts. Cord factor protects M. tuberculosis from the defenses of the host. Specifically, cord factor on the surface of M. tuberculosis cells prevents fusion between phagosomal vesicles containing the M. tuberculosis cells and the lysosomes that would destroy them. The individual components of cord factor, the trehalose sugars and mycolic acid residues, are not able to demonstrate this activity; the cord factor molecules must be fully intact. Esterase activity that targets cord factor results in the lysis of M. tuberculosis cells. However, the M. tuberculosis cells must still be alive to prevent this fusion; heat-killed cells with cord factor are unable to prevent being digested. This suggests an additional molecule from M. tuberculosis is required. Regardless, cord factor's ability to prevent fusion is related to an increased hydration force or through steric hindrance. Cord factor remains on the surface of M. tuberculosis cells until it associates with a lipid droplet, where it forms a monolayer. Then, as cord factor is in a monolayer configuration, it has a different function; it becomes fatal or harmful to the host organism. Macrophages can die when in contact with monolayers of cord factor, but not when cord factor is in other configurations. As the monolayer surface area of cord factor increases, so does its toxicity. The length of the carbon chain on cord factor has also shown to affect toxicity; a longer chain shows higher toxicity. Furthermore, fibrinogen has shown to adsorb to monolayers of cord factor and act as a cofactor for its biological effects.

Cord factor isolated from species of Nocardia has been shown to cause cachexia in mice. Severe muscle wasting occurred within 48 hours of the toxin being administered.

== Host responses and cytokines ==
Numerous responses that vary in effect result from cord factor's presence in host cells. After exposure to cord factor for 2 hours, 125 genes in the mouse genome are upregulated. After 24 hours, 503 genes are upregulated, and 162 genes are downregulated. The exact chemical mechanisms by which cord factor acts is not completely known. However, it is likely that the mycolic acids of cord factor must undergo a cyclopropyl modification to lead to a response from the host's immune system for initial infection. Furthermore, the ester linkages in cord factor are important for its toxic effects. There is evidence that cord factor is recognized by the Mincle receptor, which is found on macrophages. An activated Mincle receptor leads to a pathway that ultimately results in the production of several cytokines. These cytokines can lead to further cytokine production that promote inflammatory responses. Cord factor, through the Mincle receptor, also causes the recruitment of neutrophils, which lead to pro-inflammatory cytokines as well. However, there is also evidence that toll-like receptor 2 (TLR2) in conjunction with the protein MyD-88 is responsible for cytokine production rather than the Mincle receptor.

Cord factor presence increases the production of the cytokines interleukin-12 (IL-12), interleukin-1 beta (IL-1β), interleukin-6 (IL-6), tumor necrosis factor (TNFα), and macrophage inflammatory protein-2 (MIP-2), which are all pro-inflammatory cytokines important for granuloma formation. IL-12 is particularly important in the defense against M. tuberculosis; without it, M. tuberculosis spreads unhampered. IL-12 triggers production of more cytokines through T cells and natural killer (NK) cells, while also leading to mature Th1 cells, and thus leading to immunity. Then, with IL-12 available, Th1 cells and NK cells produce interferon gamma (IFN-γ) molecules and subsequently release them. The IFN-γ molecules in turn activate macrophages.

When macrophages are activated by cord factor, they can arrange into granulomas around M. tuberculosis cells. Activated macrophages and neutrophils also cause an increase in vascular endothelial growth factor (VEGF), which is important for angiogenesis, a step in granuloma formation. The granulomas can be formed either with or without T-cells, indicating that they can be foreign-body-type or hypersensitivity-type. This means cord factor can stimulate a response by acting as a foreign molecule or by causing harmful reactions from the immune system if the host is already immunized. Thus, cord factor can act as a nonspecific irritant or a T-cell dependent antigen. Granulomas enclose M. tuberculosis cells to halt the bacteria from spreading, but they also allow the bacteria to remain in the host. From there, the tissue can become damaged and the disease can transmit further with cord factor. Alternatively, the activated macrophages can kill the M. tuberculosis cells through reactive nitrogen intermediates to remove the infection.

Besides inducing granuloma formation, activated macrophages that result from IL-12 and IFN-γ are able to limit tumor growth. Furthermore, cord factor's stimulation of TNF-α production, also known as cachectin, is also able to induce cachexia, or loss of weight, within hosts. Cord factor also increases NADase activity in the host, and thus it lowers NAD; enzymes that require NAD decrease in activity accordingly. Cord factor is thus able to obstruct oxidative phosphorylation and the electron transport chain in mitochondrial membranes. In mice, cord factor has shown to cause atrophy in the thymus through apoptosis; similarly in rabbits, atrophy of the thymus and spleen occurred. This atrophy occurs in conjunction with granuloma formation, and if granuloma formation is disturbed, so is the progression of atrophy.

== Scientific applications and uses ==
Infection by M. tuberculosis remains a serious problem in the world and knowledge of cord factor can be useful in controlling this disease. For example, the glycoprotein known as lactoferrin is able to mitigate cytokine production and granuloma formation brought on by cord factor. However, cord factor can serve as a useful model for all pathogenic glycolipids and therefore it can provide insight for more than just itself as a virulence factor. Hydrophobic beads covered with cord factor are an effective tool for such research; they are able to reproduce an organism's response to cord factor from M. tuberculosis cells. Cord factor beads are easily created and applied to organisms for study, and then easily recovered.

It is possible to form cord factor liposomes through water emulsion; these liposomes are nontoxic and can be used to maintain a steady supply of activated macrophages. Cord factor under proper control can potentially be useful in fighting cancer because IL-12 and IFN-γ are able to limit the growth of tumors.

== See also ==
- Nocardia
