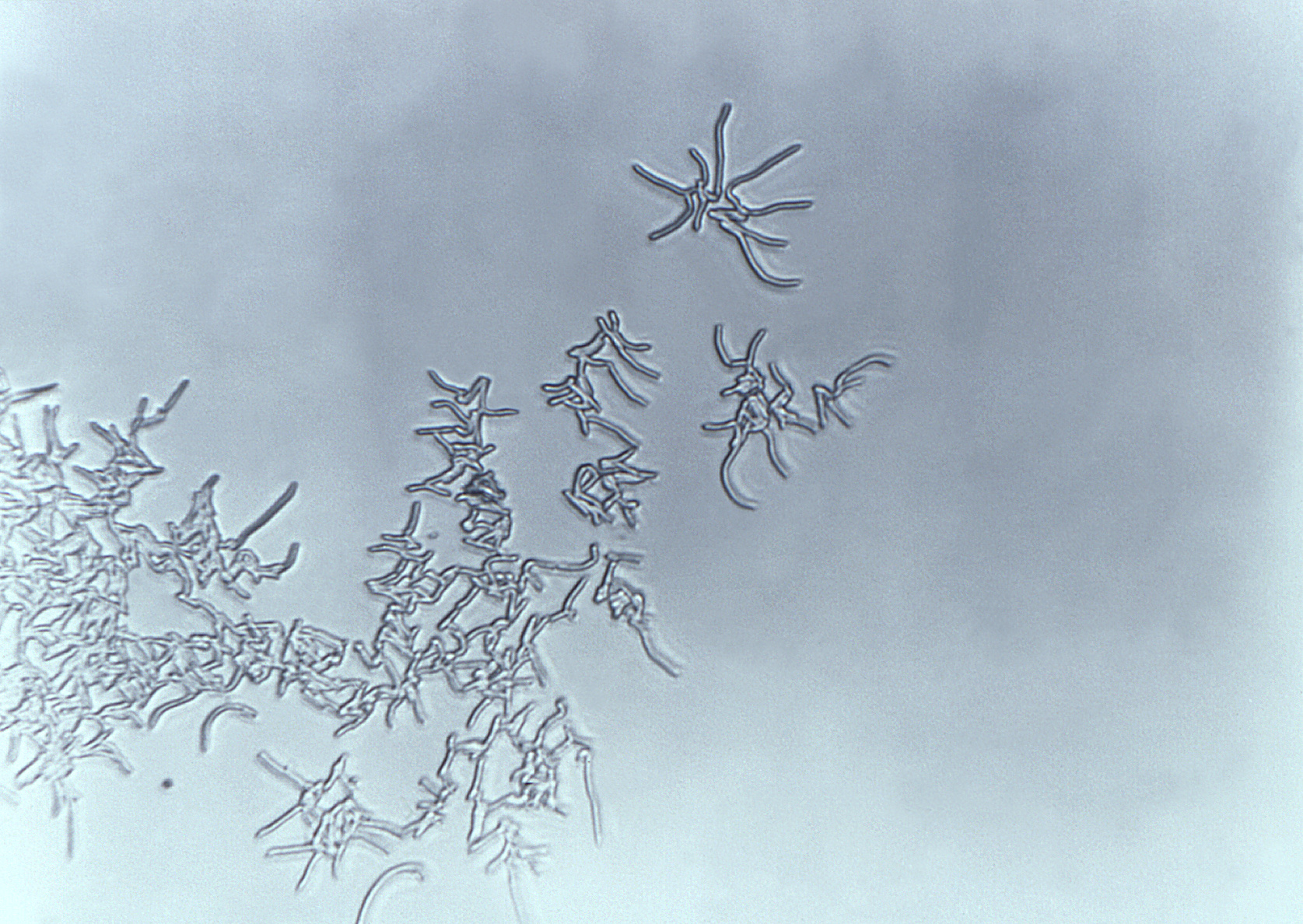

Scientific classification
- Domain: Bacteria
- Kingdom: Bacillati
- Phylum: Actinomycetota
- Class: Actinomycetes
- Order: Mycobacteriales
- Family: Nocardiaceae
- Genus: Rhodococcus
- Species: R. equi

Binomial name
- Rhodococcus equi (Magnusson 1923) Goodfellow and Alderson 1977 (Approved Lists 1980)

= Rhodococcus equi =

Species of bacterium

Rhodococcus equi is a Gram-positive coccobacillus bacterium. The organism is commonly found in dry and dusty soil and can be important for diseases of domesticated animals (horses and goats). The frequency of infection can reach near 60%. R. equi is an important pathogen causing pneumonia in foals. Since 2008, R. equi has been known to infect wild boar and domestic pigs. R. equi can infect immunocompromised people, such as HIV-AIDS patients or organ transplant recipients. Rhodococcus equi infection in these populations resemble the clinical and pathological signs of advanced pulmonary tuberculosis. This organism is a facultative intracellular mycobacterial pathogen.

== Hosts ==
- Pigs (wild and domestic)
- Goats
- Horses
- Sheep
- Cattle
- Humans
- Cats may become infected if wound is exposed.

== Virulence ==
The most common route of infection in horses is likely via inhalation of contaminated dust particles. Inhaled virulent strains of R. equi are phagocytosed by alveolar macrophages. During normal phagocytosis, bacteria are enclosed by the phagosome, which fuses with the lysosome to become a phagolysosome. The internal environment of the phagolysosome contains nucleases and proteases, which are activated by the low pH of the compartment. The macrophage produces bacteriocidal compounds (e.g., oxygen radicals) following the respiratory burst. However, like its close relative Mycobacterium tuberculosis, R. equi prevents the fusion of the phagosome with the lysosome and acidification of the phagosome. Additionally, the respiratory burst is inhibited. This allows R. equi to multiply within the phagosome where it is shielded from the immune system by the very cell that was supposed to kill it. After about 48 hours, the macrophage is killed by necrosis, not apoptosis. Necrosis is pro-inflammatory, attracting additional phagocytic cells to the site of infection, eventually resulting in massive tissue damage.

== Virulence plasmid ==
All strains isolated from foals and the majority of human, cattle, and pig isolates contain a large plasmid. This plasmid has been shown to be essential for infection of foals, and presumably plays a similar role for infection of other hosts, although this has not been established yet. Strains that lack the virulence plasmid are unable to proliferate in macrophages. This virulence plasmid has been characterised in detail from equine and porcine strains, although only the former has been functionally characterised. These circular plasmids consist of a conserved backbone responsible for replication and bacterial conjugation of the plasmid. This portion of the plasmid is highly conserved and found in nonpathogenic Rhodococci plasmids. In addition to the conserved region, the virulence plasmids contain a highly variable region that has undergone substantial genetic rearrangements, including inversion and deletions. This region has a different GC-content from the rest of the plasmid, and is flanked by genes associated with mobile genetic elements. It is therefore assumed to be derived from a different bacterial species than the backbone of the plasmid via lateral gene transfer.

== Pathogenicity island ==
The variable region of the virulence plasmid contain genes that are highly expressed following phagocytosis of R. equi by macrophages. This variable region is believed to be a pathogenicity island that contains genes essential for virulence.

A hallmark of the pathogenicity island (PAI) is that many genes within it do not have homologues in other species. The most notable of these are the virulence-associated protein (vap) genes. All foals infected with R. equi produce high levels of antibodies specific for vapA, the first vap gene to be characterised. Deletion of vapA renders the resulting strain avirulent. In addition to vapA, the PAI encodes a further five full-length vap homologues, one truncated vap gene, and two vap pseudogenes. The porcine PAI contains five full-length vap genes, including the vapA homologue, vapB. In addition to these unique genes, the PAI contains genes that have a known function, in particular two regulatory genes encoding the LysR-type regulator VirR and the response regulator Orf8. These two proteins have been shown to control expression of a number of PAI genes including vapA. Other genes have homology to transport proteins and enzymes. However, the functionality of these genes or how the proteins encoded within PAI subvert the macrophage has not yet been established.

== Taxonomic debate ==
While this organism is generally known as Rhodococcus equi, there has been taxonomic debate since the 1980s about whether this name is the valid name, with Rhodococcus hoagii and Prescottella equi both proposed as official alternative names. Other names used in literature include Nocardia restricta, Corynebacterium equi, Bacillus hoagii, Corynebacterium purulentus, Mycobacterium equi, Mycobacterium restrictum, and Proactinomyces restrictus.
