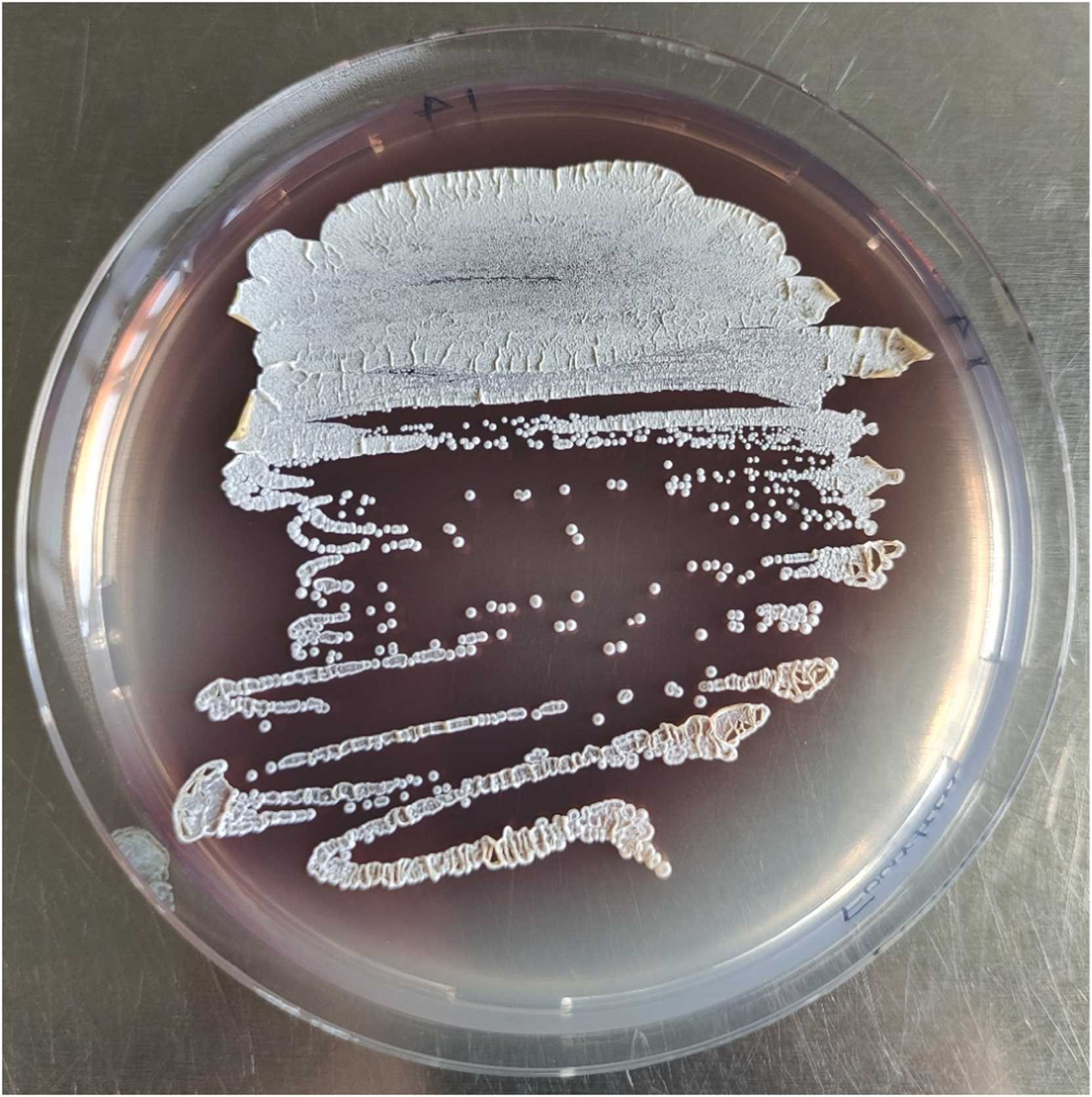

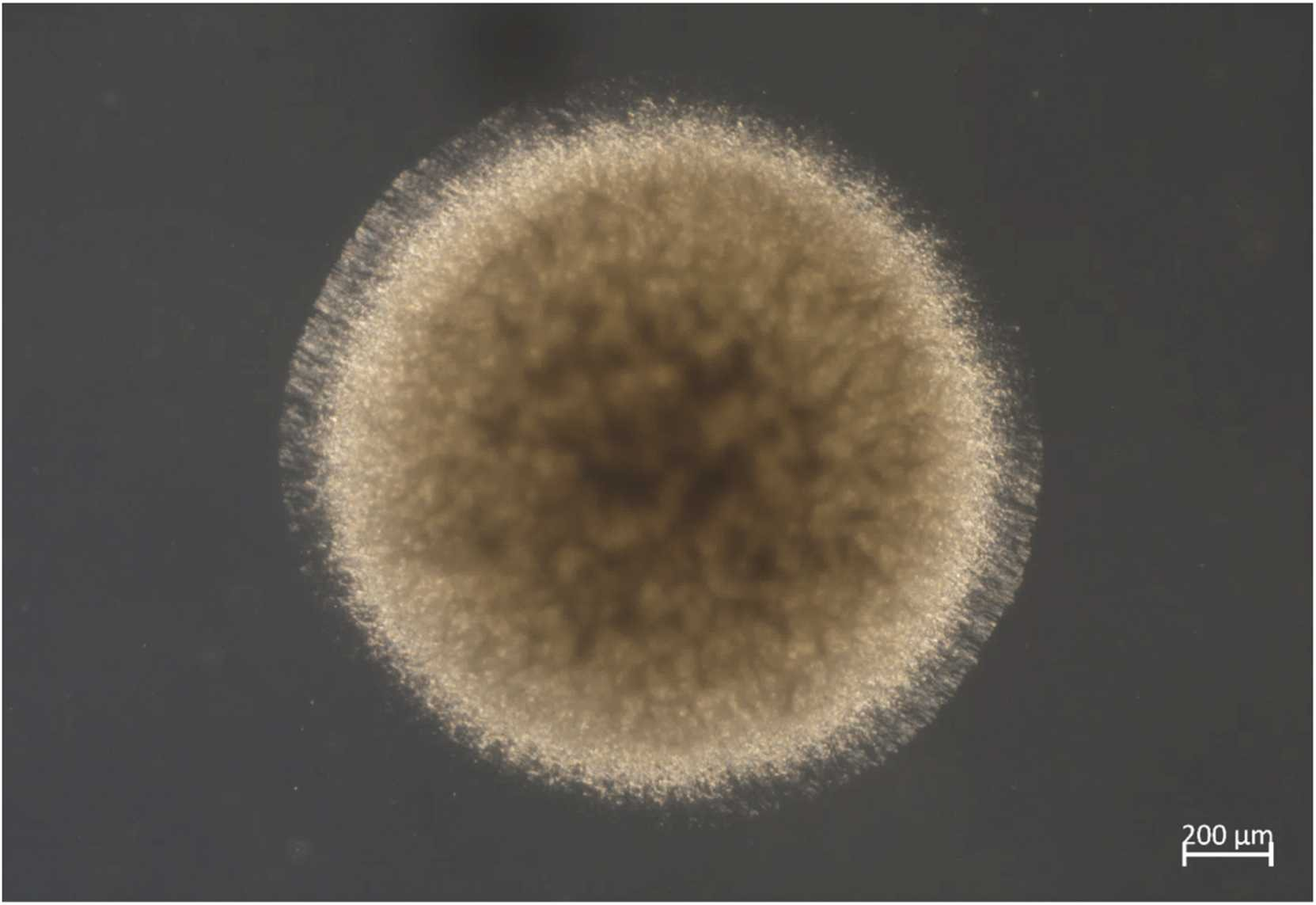

Scientific classification
- Domain: Bacteria
- Kingdom: Bacillati
- Phylum: Actinomycetota
- Class: Actinomycetes
- Order: Mycobacteriales
- Family: Nocardiaceae
- Genus: Nocardia
- Species: N. nepalensis

Binomial name
- Nocardia nepalensis Aryal et al. 2025

= Nocardia nepalensis =

Species of bacterium

Nocardia nepalensis is a species of bacteria from the genus Nocardia that has been isolated from forest soil in Nepal. Its type strain is ACa13097^{T} (= DSM 118930^{T} = NCCB 101050^{T}). N. nepalensis is an aerobic, non-motile, and filamentous shape actinomycetes with brown-red pigmentation. It is 9,609,226 bp long and G+C content is 66.20 mol%.
