= Nocardia aurantiaca =

Scientific classification
- Domain: Bacteria
- Kingdom: Bacillati
- Phylum: Actinomycetota
- Class: Actinomycetes
- Order: Mycobacteriales
- Family: Nocardiaceae
- Genus: Nocardia
- Species: N. aurantiaca

Binomial name
- Nocardia aurantiaca Kanchanasin et al. 2020

Type strain
- CT2-14; JCM 33775; TISTR 2838

Species of bacterium

Nocardia aurantiaca is a species of bacteria from the genus Nocardia that has been isolated from soil in Thailand.
