= Dihydrocarveol dehydrogenase =

Identifiers
- EC no.: 1.1.1.296

Databases
- BRENDA: enzyme data
- ExPASy: NiceZyme view
- KEGG: enzyme entry
- MetaCyc: metabolic pathway
- Rhea: reactions
- PDB structures: RCSB PDB PDBe PDBsum
Search
- PMC: articles
- PubMed: articles
- NCBI: proteins

Dihydrocarveol dehydrogenase (EC 1.1.1.296, carveol dehydrogenase (ambiguous)) is an enzyme with systematic name menth-8-en-2-ol:NAD^{+} oxidoreductase. This enzyme catalyses the following chemical reaction

menth-8-en-2-ol + NAD^{+} $\rightleftharpoons$ menth-8-en-2-one + NADH + H^{+}

This enzyme from the Gram-positive bacterium Rhodococcus erythropolis DCL14 forms part of the carveol and dihydrocarveol degradation pathway. The enzyme accepts all eight stereoisomers of menth-8-en-2-ol as substrate, although some isomers are converted faster than others. The preferred substrates are (+)-neoisodihydrocarveol, (+)-isodihydrocarveol, (+)-dihydrocarveol and (-)-isodihydrocarveol.
