= Nocardia salmonicida =

Scientific classification
- Domain: Bacteria
- Kingdom: Bacillati
- Phylum: Actinomycetota
- Class: Actinomycetes
- Order: Mycobacteriales
- Family: Nocardiaceae
- Genus: Nocardia
- Species: N. salmonicida

Binomial name
- Nocardia salmonicida Kudo et al., 1988

Species of bacterium

Nocardia salmonicida is a species of gram-positive, aerobic, acid-alcohol-fast filamentous bacterium from the order Mycobacteriales known for inflicting fish with nocardiosis, a disease characterized by the formation of granulomatous lesions in internal organs, resulting in significant mortality. A LAMP assay was detailed in 2014 to assist with rapid detection of the species.

== Etymology ==
Salmonicida is derived from the Latin salmonis, meaning "salmon", with the suffix cida, which is from the Latin word caedo, meaning to cut or kill. The full name translates to "salmon-killer".

== Taxonomy ==
Strain JCM 4826 was originally assigned as Streptomyces salmoncida by American zoologist Augusta Rucker in 1949, after being discovered in sockeye salmon (Oncorhynchus nerka), and then named Nocardia salmonicida after the inclusion of further chemotaxonomic data in 1971, 1985, and 1988. The species was linked to Nocardia asteroides based on DNA analysis.
