= Carvone reductase =

Enzyme

Identifiers
- EC no.: 1.3.99.25

Databases
- IntEnz: IntEnz view
- BRENDA: BRENDA entry
- ExPASy: NiceZyme view
- KEGG: KEGG entry
- MetaCyc: metabolic pathway
- PRIAM: profile
- PDB structures: RCSB PDB PDBe PDBsum
Search
- PMC: articles
- PubMed: articles
- NCBI: proteins

Carvone reductase (EC 1.3.99.25) is an enzyme with systematic name (+)-dihydrocarvone:acceptor 1,6-oxidoreductase. This enzyme catalyses the following two chemical reactions

(+)-carvone
+ reduced acceptor
cis-dihydrocarvone
+ oxidised acceptor
(–)-carvone
+ reduced acceptor
trans-dihydrocarvone
+ oxidised acceptor

This enzyme participates in the carveol and dihydrocarveol degradation pathway of the Gram-positive bacterium Rhodococcus erythropolis.
