= Rhodococcus marinonascens =

Scientific classification
- Domain: Bacteria
- Kingdom: Bacillati
- Phylum: Actinomycetota
- Class: Actinomycetes
- Order: Mycobacteriales
- Family: Nocardiaceae
- Genus: Rhodococcus
- Species: R. marinonascens

Binomial name
- Rhodococcus marinonascens Helmke and Weyland 1984

Species of bacterium

Rhodococcus marinonascens is a bacterium species in the genus Rhodococcus. It is moderately halophilic and psychrotrophic, with type strain 3438W (= DSM 43752).
