= Nocardia veterana =

Scientific classification
- Domain: Bacteria
- Kingdom: Bacillati
- Phylum: Actinomycetota
- Class: Actinomycetes
- Order: Mycobacteriales
- Family: Nocardiaceae
- Genus: Nocardia
- Species: N. veterana

Binomial name
- Nocardia veterana Gürtler et al. 2001

Type strain
- CCUG 46118; CIP 107095; DSM 44445; JCM 11307; M157222; NBRC 100344; NRRL B-24136

Species of bacterium

Nocardia veterana is a species of bacteria from the genus Nocardia that has been isolated from human bronchial lavage.
