= Nocardia transvalensis =

Scientific classification
- Domain: Bacteria
- Kingdom: Bacillati
- Phylum: Actinomycetota
- Class: Actinomycetes
- Order: Mycobacteriales
- Family: Nocardiaceae
- Genus: Nocardia
- Species: N. transvalensis

Binomial name
- Nocardia transvalensis Pijper and Pullinger 1927 (Approved Lists 1980)

Type strain
- ATCC 6865; CCUG 45937; CIP 104841; DSM 43405; DSM 43582; IFO 15921; JCM 9099; NBRC 15921; NRRL B-16037; VKM Ac-867

Species of bacterium

Nocardia transvalensis is a species of bacteria from the genus Nocardia that is known to cause nocardiosis.
