= The Great Imitator =

Disease that shows symptoms of another

The Great Imitator (also the Great Masquerader) is a phrase used for medical conditions that feature nonspecific symptoms and may be confused with a number of other diseases. The term connotes especially difficult differential diagnosis, increased potential for misdiagnosis, and the protean nature of some diseases. Most great imitators are systemic in nature or have systemic sequelae, and an aspect of nonspecific symptoms is logically almost always involved. In some cases, an assumption that a particular sign or symptom, or a particular pattern of several thereof, is pathognomonic turns out to be false, as the reality is that it is only nearly so.

As recently as the 1950s, syphilis was widely considered by physicians to be "the great imitator", and in the next few decades after that, several other candidates, mainly tuberculosis but occasionally others, were asserted as being "the second great imitator". In recent decades, more than a dozen diseases have been recognized in the medical literature as worthy of being considered great imitators, on the common theme of recurring misdiagnoses/missed diagnoses and protean manifestations.

The list of great imitators here relies on references in the medical literature applying that label, or on other references documenting a condition's especially recurrent and poignant reputation for misdiagnoses.

Conditions or diseases sometimes referred to with this nickname include the following:

== Low blood sugar ==
- Hypoglycemia as an imitator of a stroke

== Tumors (neoplasms), especially cancerous tumors or any endocrine tumors ==
- Cancers generally
  - Intravascular large B-cell lymphoma
  - Mycosis fungoides
  - Malignant metastases
    - Cutaneous metastases
- Oral cancer
- Pheochromocytoma
- Paraneoplastic syndromes, in endocrine oncology: symptoms from any type of functioning (that is, hormone-producing) endocrine tumor; such tumors secrete excess hormones in a way that is homeostatically senseless, thus disrupting homeostasis (in any of many diverse ways, depending on which hormone, what dosage, and which location)
  - Functioning neuroendocrine tumors (NETs)
    - Most generally, a caveat to obtain PET-CT in cases where differential diagnosis seems to be repeatedly failing, as PET can "see" NETs better than other imaging can
    - Functioning pancreatic neuroendocrine tumors (panNETs or pNETs) (example: intractable diarrhea resistant to differential diagnosis)
- Renal cell carcinoma
- See also: any mass effect inside the cranium (including from non-neoplastic causes)

== Vitamin deficiency ==
- Thiamine deficiency (vitamin B₁ deficiency), with focus on subclinical forms and nonsevere clinical forms as well as the severe form called beriberi
  - This topic overlaps substantially with the topic of excessive alcohol use, which impairs B₁ metabolism and leads to hepatic encephalopathy. Relatedly, alcohol use disorder has been implicated as a great imitator at least once in the medical literature. But the topic of thiamine deficiency also has been identified as an important component not only of malnutrition in the classic senses of semistarvation or food insecurity but also in the sense of high-calorie malnutrition, even in people who do not use alcohol. Hepatic encephalopathy is a wide-ranging topic that includes covert, subclinical, minimal, mild, nonalcoholic, alcoholic, moderate, and severe forms, just as (relatedly) fatty liver disease also has covert, subclinical, minimal, mild, nonalcoholic, alcoholic, moderate, and severe forms. At bottom, it is established that the liver's function and the gut–brain axis affect the brain and thus the mind, although not every correlation is understood.
- Vitamin B12 deficiency, due to its wide presentation with neurologic, haematologic, psychiatric, and physiological symptoms.

== Substance abuse ==
- Substance abuse can be confused with medical, psychiatric, and surgical conditions.

== Rheumatic diseases (most with autoimmune components) ==
- Various rheumatic diseases, including:
  - Fibromyalgia
  - Psoriatic arthritis
  - Lupus erythematosus
    - Systemic lupus erythematosus
  - Gout
- A general theme with autoimmune diseases is that strange signs and symptoms can result (and can make differential diagnosis difficult) "whenever the body is attacking its own cells in unusual ways"

== Dysplastic diseases, some with precancerous or rheumatologic aspects ==
- Sarcoidosis
- Endometriosis, often misdiagnosed

== Neurologic disorders ==
- Multiple sclerosis

== Gut diseases ==
- Coeliac disease
- Closely related to gut function is liver function; see information on vitamin bioactivity

=== Abdominal inflammations or their mimics ===
- Appendicitis or its mimics
- Pancreatitis

== Endocrine disorders ==
- Adrenal insufficiency, especially Addison's disease
- Hypothyroidism
- Endocrine tumors: see tumor information
- A general theme with endocrine diseases is that strange signs and symptoms can result (and can make differential diagnosis difficult) "whenever any endocrine gland or endocrine tumor is secreting hormones in unusual ways (either too much or too little)," because of the very nature of hormones as chemical messengers (thus deranged hormones cause deranged function)

== Thromboembolic events or their mimics ==
- Pulmonary embolism
- Stroke, stroke mimics, and stroke chameleons
  - Hypoglycemia as an imitator of a stroke

== Infectious diseases ==
- Various infectious diseases, including:
  - Syphilis
  - Lyme disease, whose potential as a new great imitator provoked fear in the 1980s and 1990s because of reported cases of misdiagnosis with debilitating consequences; today it is generally considered better understood and is treatable, making it no longer quite so fearfully mysterious, but it remains worthy of consideration with compatible exam findings and when exposure to Lyme-carrying ticks is probable.
  - Nocardiosis
  - Tuberculosis
    - Pulmonary tuberculosis
    - Cutaneous tuberculosis
  - Brucellosis
  - Infective endocarditis
  - Malaria
  - Leprosy
  - Leishmaniasis
  - Viral exanthems in children
  - Gastrointestinal infections: when appendicitis or pancreatitis have infectious causes
  - Rabies (prodromal phase)
  - Cryptococcal pneumonia

== Breathing-related sleep disorders (sleep-disordered breathing) ==
- Sleep apnea/hypopnea
- Upper airway resistance syndrome

== Proteinopathies ==
- Amyloidosis

== Mass effect inside the cranium ==
- Any mass effect inside the cranium (including from non-neoplastic causes):
  - Hydrocephalus, causing gait disturbances, poor memory, strange behavior, mental impairment, and urinary incontinence, sometimes leading to psychiatric misdiagnoses, especially in cases where the focal neurologic signs are absent; a warning to obtain CT or MRI of the brain to rule out other causes of apparently psychiatric symptoms
  - Intracranial hemorrhage: see thromboembolic events or their mimics
  - Brain tumor: see Tumors

== Skin conditions ==
- Scabies
