= Millisia brevis =

Scientific classification
- Domain: Bacteria
- Kingdom: Bacillati
- Phylum: Actinomycetota
- Class: Actinomycetes
- Order: Mycobacteriales
- Family: Nocardiaceae
- Genus: Millisia; Soddell et al. 2006
- Species: M. brevis

Binomial name
- Millisia brevis Soddell et al. 2006

Type strain
- BCRC 16840; CCRC 16840; CIP 109234; DSM 44463; IFM 10694; J81; JCM 13999; NRRL B-24424

Species of bacterium

Millisia brevis is a mycolic acid producing bacterium from the family Nocardiaceae which has been isolated from activated sludge in Australia.
