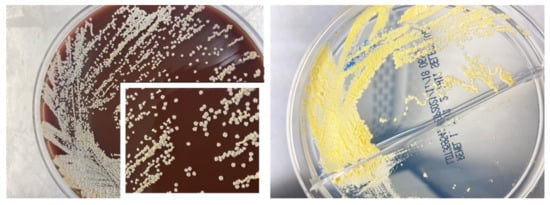

Scientific classification
- Domain: Bacteria
- Kingdom: Bacillati
- Phylum: Actinomycetota
- Class: Actinomycetes
- Order: Mycobacteriales
- Family: Nocardiaceae
- Genus: Nocardia
- Species: N. brasiliensis

Binomial name
- Nocardia brasiliensis (Lindenberg 1909) Pinoy 1913 (Approved Lists 1980)

= Nocardia brasiliensis =

Species of bacterium

Nocardia brasiliensis is a species of gram-positive, rod-shaped bacteriaNocardia, which are a type of . As with most members of Actinomycetota, they contain high guanine and cytosine content. N. brasiliensis can cause nocardiosis. Nocardiosis has been successfully treated with trimethoprim-sulfamethoxazole.
