= SQ109 =

Names
- Preferred IUPAC name N^{1}-(Adamantan-2-yl)-N^{2}-[(2E)-3,7-dimethylocta-2,6-dien-1-yl]ethane-1,2-diamine

Identifiers
CAS Number	502487-67-4
3D model (JSmol)	Interactive image
ChEBI	cation: CHEBI:188155
ChEMBL	ChEMBL561057
ChemSpider	4438718
DrugBank	DB05186
IUPHAR/BPS	7997
PubChem CID	5274428
UNII	9AU7XUV31A
CompTox Dashboard (EPA)	DTXSID30964540
- InChI: InChI=1S/C22H38N2/c1-16(2)5-4-6-17(3)7-8-23-9-10-24-22-20-12-18-11-19(14-20)15-21(22)13-18/h5,7,18-24H,4,6,8-15H2,1-3H3/b17-7+ Key: JFIBVDBTCDTBRH-REZTVBANSA-N; cation: Key: JFIBVDBTCDTBRH-REZTVBANSA-O
- SMILES: CC(=CCC/C(=C/CNCCN[C@@H]1C2CC3CC(C2)CC1C3)/C)C

Properties
Chemical formula	C_{22}H_{38}N_{2}
Molar mass	330.560 g·mol^{−1}
- Except where otherwise noted, data are given for materials in their standard state (at 25 °C [77 °F], 100 kPa). verify (what is ?) Infobox references

SQ109 is a drug undergoing development for treatment of tuberculosis.

== Background ==
On October 16, 2007, it was given the status of Orphan drug by the U.S. Food and Drug Administration (FDA) for use against drug-susceptible and drug-resistant TB bacteria.

SQ109 completed three phase I studies in the U.S. and one Phase II efficacy studies in tuberculosis patients in Africa. SQ109 showed activity against both drug susceptible and multi-drug-resistant tuberculosis bacteria, including extensively drug-resistant tuberculosis strains. In preclinical studies SQ109 enhanced the activity of anti-tubercular drugs isoniazid and rifampin and reduced by >30% the time required to cure mice of experimental TB.

SQ109 is being developed by OOO Infectex in Russia and by Sequella Inc internationally. In July 2012, Infectex received notification from the Russian Ministry of Health for approval to begin the pivotal clinical trial associated with a drug registration submission, and can proceed with the clinical development of SQ109 for treatment of tuberculosis in the Russian Federation.

== See also ==
- Adamantane
- Ethambutol (An older drug with a similar mechanism of action)
