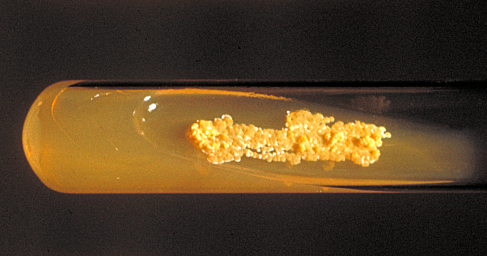

Scientific classification
- Domain: Bacteria
- Kingdom: Bacillati
- Phylum: Actinomycetota
- Class: Actinomycetes
- Order: Mycobacteriales
- Family: Nocardiaceae
- Genus: Nocardia
- Species: N. asteroides

Binomial name
- Nocardia asteroides (Eppinger 1891) Blanchard 1896 (Approved Lists 1980)

= Nocardia asteroides =

Species of bacterium

Nocardia asteroides is a species of Nocardia. It can cause nocardiosis, a severe pulmonary infection in immunocompromised hosts.
