= Rhodococcus erythropolis =

Scientific classification
- Domain: Bacteria
- Kingdom: Bacillati
- Phylum: Actinomycetota
- Class: Actinomycetes
- Order: Mycobacteriales
- Family: Nocardiaceae
- Genus: Rhodococcus
- Species: R. erythropolis

Binomial name
- Rhodococcus erythropolis (Gray and Thornton 1928) Goodfellow and Alderson 1979 (Approved Lists 1980)

Type strain
- ATCC 4277; CIP 104179; DSM 43066; HAMBI 1953; IEGM 7 IFO 15567; JCM 20419; JCM 3201; LMG 5359; N11; NBRC 15567; NCIB 9158; NCIMB 9158; NCTC 13021; NRRL B-16025; VKM Ac-858

Synonyms
- "Mycobacterium erythropolis" Gray and Thornton 1928; Rhodococcus baikonurensis Li et al. 2004; Rhodococcus degradans Švec et al. 2015; Rhodococcus enclensis Dastager et al. 2014; Rhodococcus jialingiae Wang et al. 2010; Rhodococcus qingshengii Xu et al. 2007

Species of bacterium

Rhodococcus erythropolis is an aerobic Gram-positive bacterium species in the genus Rhodococcus. The name Rhodococcus erythropolis is derived from its morphogenetic cycle from branching to rod and to coccus morphology, which explains the series of morphological changes this bacterium undergoing during growth and development processes. These bacterium are found in red and orange colonies when observed; this explains the species name erythropolis which means "red city" in Greek.

== Characteristics and adaptability ==
This bacterium is aerobic and can be found in soil surfaces where oxygen is abundant and is described as red and orange colored when they are cultured on a medium. This bacterium is non-motile and have an unusual cell envelope composition characterized by a high mycolic acid content, which helps to elevate the cell surface ability of hydrophobicity. This characteristic of the cell surface helps the bacterium to survive between polar and non-polar media.

== Diversity ==
Rhodococcus strains as well as R. erythropolis variants are widely distributed throughout diverse environments ranging from sea level to Alpine soils, deep sea to coastal sediments and Arctic to Antarctic samples. This wide distribution explains their adaptability and resilience in various ecosystems. R. erythropolis has been isolated from the air of the Russian Space Laboratory Mir along with a large number of other microorganisms that steadily accumulated during the lifespan of the station. Rhodococcus bacteria are known to degrade organic compounds contained in the rubber used aboard the space station with specialized enzymes. This can lead to degradation of critical components and necessitates replacement of the parts or preventive measures dealing with microbial contamination.

== History ==
R. erythropolis was named as Mycobacterium erythropolis, and then later called with other names such as Nocardia erythropolis etc., before changing it to Rhodococcus erythropolis based on its growth and morphological characteristics.

== Pathogenicity ==
There were few cases that are infected by R. erythropolis. This bacterium found on various sites of the body such as skin, eye, and bloodstream, and in sputum of a pulmonary illness patient. Though Rhodococcus spp. are found to be infectious to plants and animals, the R. erythropolis is believed to have minimal pathogenic potential; however, sporadic reports have highlighted its clinically significant involvement in certain cases.

== Metabolism ==
Rhodococcus erythropolis exhibits a metabolic diversity and produces enzymes that are capable to degrade (including oxidation, dehydrogenation, epoxidation, hydrolysis, hydroxylation, dehalogenation and desulfurization) a wide range of hydrophobic compounds, and xenobiotics such as polycyclic aromatic hydrocarbons, polychlorinated biphenyls, and dibenzothiophenes. This metabolic versatility is due to the presence and movement of large plasmids, also due to the multiple homologous enzymes in catabolic pathways, to enrich the bacterium versatility. Due to the bacterium ability of resisting to tough chemicals and breaking down difficult-to-remove compounds like lignin, petroleum, and pesticides, R. erythropolis are called as master of metabolisms and remarkable. Hence it explains the widely usage of the R. eythropolis for degrading environmental pollutions.

R. erythropolis is capable of changing the fatty acid composition of its membrane in response to different carbon sources which helps to maintain membrane fluidity and essential biological functions under different environmental conditions. This explains its ability of resilience and adaptability. This micro-organism exhibits Oligotrophic growth and is referred with this term since its CO_{2} fixation system is not yet discovered.

== Applications in biotechnology ==
In biotechnological applications, R. erythropolis has proven to be a robust biocatalyst, capable of enduring the presence of deleterious substances commonly faced in organic-aqueous biotransformation systems. This bacterium cells able to tolerate and adapt to solvents under stress conditions to protect cell population from solvent effects, since solvent toxicity is a major factor influencing cell behavior and performance in biotransformation systems. R. erythropolis can naturally grow in contaminated environments, due to this mechanism this bacterium is used in the process of bioremediation. Apart from the bacterium role in bioremediation, R. erythropolis is capable of acting as biological control in plants. The bacterium's abilities of catabolic mechanisms and degrading abilities are used to disrupt quorum sensing mediated communication of gram negative pathogens that affects plants particularly in phyllosphere and rhizosphere. The role of R. erythropolis as a biological control in plants explains its application in agriculture and environmental applications.

== Genomics ==
R. erythropolis bacterium genome consists of one main chromosome with 6,455,263 bp, one linear plasmid(227,989bp), and three circular plasmids with ([79,600bp], [5,420bp], [5,444bp]). The G+C contents occupies 59 to 62% genome. The whole genome contains 6, 318 putative coding sequences, 60 tRNAs, and 5 rrn operons.
