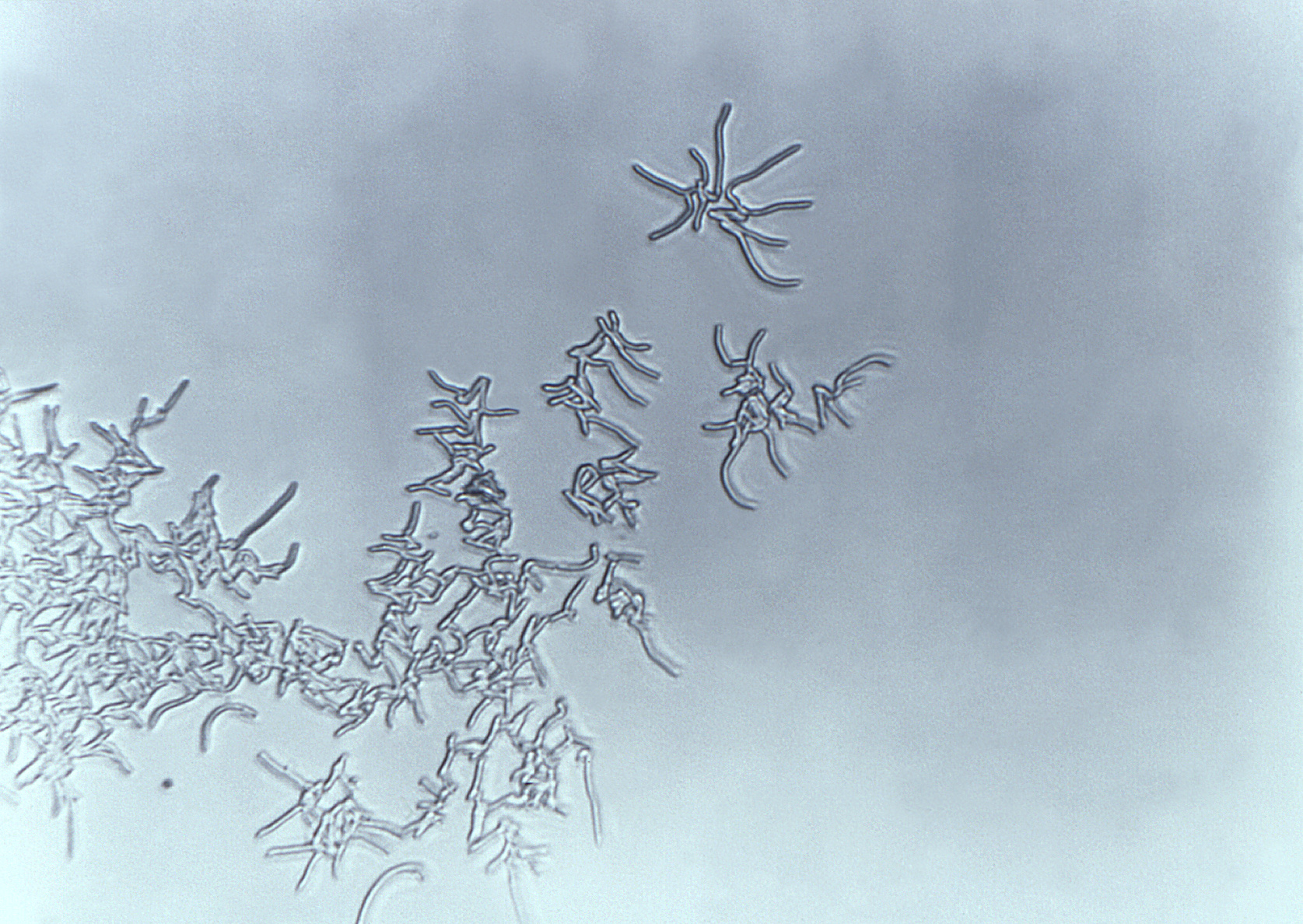
- Rhodococcus sp.

Scientific classification
- Domain: Bacteria
- Kingdom: Bacillati
- Phylum: Actinomycetota
- Class: Actinomycetes
- Order: Mycobacteriales
- Family: Nocardiaceae
- Genus: Rhodococcus; Zopf 1891

Type species
- Rhodococcus rhodochrous (Zopf 1891) Tsukamura 1974 (Approved Lists 1980)

Species
- See text.

Synonyms
- "Prescottella" Jones et al. 2013; "Prescottia" Jones et al. 2013; "Spelaeibacter" Kim et al. 2022

= Rhodococcus =

Genus of bacteria

Rhodococcus is a genus of aerobic, nonsporulating, nonmotile Gram-positive bacteria closely related to Mycobacterium and Corynebacterium. While a few species are pathogenic, most are benign, and have been found to thrive in a broad range of environments, including soil, water, and eukaryotic cells. Some species have large genomes, including the 9.7 megabasepair genome (67% G/C) of Rhodococcus sp. RHA1.

Strains of Rhodococcus are important owing to their ability to catabolize a wide range of compounds and produce bioactive steroids, acrylamide, and acrylic acid, and their involvement in fossil fuel biodesulfurization. This genetic and catabolic diversity is not only due to the large bacterial chromosome, but also to the presence of three large linear plasmids. Rhodococcus is also an experimentally advantageous system owing to a relatively fast growth rate and simple developmental cycle, but is not well characterized.

Another important application of Rhodococcus comes from bioconversion, using biological systems to convert cheap starting material into more valuable compounds, such as its ability to metabolize harmful environmental pollutants, including toluene, naphthalene, herbicides, and PCBs. Rhodococcus species typically metabolize aromatic substrates by first oxygenating the aromatic ring to form a diol (two alcohol groups). Then, the ring is cleaved with intra/extradiol mechanisms, opening the ring and exposing the substrate to further metabolism. Since the chemistry is very stereospecific, the diols are created with predictable chirality. While controlling the chirality of chemical reaction presents a significant challenge for synthetic chemists, biological processes can be used instead to faithfully produce chiral molecules in cases where direct chemical synthesis is not feasible or efficient. An example of this is the use of Rhodococcus to produce chiral indandiol derivatives which serve as synthetic intermediates for indinavir, a protease inhibitor used in the treatment of HIV/AIDS.

The conversion of indene to trans-1R,2R-indandiol and cis-1S,2R-indandiol by Rhodococcus sp.

== Biodegradation of organic pollutants ==
Rhodococcus has been greatly researched as a potential agent for the bioremediation of pollutants as it is commonly found in the natural environment, and they possess certain characteristics that allow them to thrive under a variety of conditions, and they have the capability to metabolize many hydrocarbons.

Rhodococci possess many properties that makes them suitable for bioremediation under a range of environments. Their ability to undergo microaerophilic respiration allows them to survive in environments containing low oxygen concentrations, and their ability to undergo aerobic respiration also allows them to survive in oxygenated environments. They also undergo nitrogen fixation, which allows them to generate their own nutrients in environments with low nutrients.

Rhodococci also contain characteristics that enhances their ability to degrade organic pollutants. Their hydrophobic surface allows for adhesion to hydrocarbons, which enhances its ability to degrade these pollutants. They have a wide variety of catabolic pathways and many unique enzyme functions. This gives them the ability to degrade many recalcitrant, toxic hydrocarbons. For example, Rhodococci expresses dioxygenases, which can be used to degrade benzotrifluoride, a recalcitrant pollutant. Rhodococcus sp. strain Q1, a strain naturally found in soil and paper mill sludge, contains the ability to degrade quinoline, various pyridine derivatives, catechol, benzoate, and protocatechuic acid. Rhodococci are also capable of accumulating heavy metal ions, such as radioactive caesium, allowing for easier removal from the environment. Other pollutants, such as azo dyes, pesticides and polychlorinated biphenyls can also be degraded by Rhodococci.

Scanning electron micrograph of Rhodococcus sp. strain Q1 grown on quinoline - the organism can use quinoline as a sole source of carbon, nitrogen, and energy, tolerating concentrations up to 3.88 millimoles per liter.

== Pathogenic Rhodococcus ==
The genus Rhodococcus has two pathogenic species: R. fascians and R. equi. The former, a plant pathogen, causes leafy gall disease in both angiosperm and gymnosperm plants. R. equi is the causative agent of foal pneumonia (rattles) and mainly infects foals up to three months in age. However, it has a wide host range, sporadically infecting pigs, cattle, and immunocompromised humans, in particular AIDS patients and those undergoing immunosuppressive therapy. Both pathogens rely on a conjugative virulence plasmid to cause disease. In case of R. fascians, this is a linear plasmid, whereas R. equi harbors a circular plasmid. Both pathogens are economically significant. R. fascians is a major pathogen of tobacco plants. R. equi, one of the most important foal pathogens, is endemic on many stud farms around the world.

== In molecular biology ==
Rhodococcus has also been identified as a contaminant of DNA extraction kit reagents and ultrapure water systems, which may lead to its erroneous appearance in microbiota or metagenomic datasets.

== Species ==
Rhodococcus comprises the following species:

- R. aerolatus Hwang et al. 2015
- R. aetherivorans Goodfellow et al. 2004
- R. agglutinans Guo et al. 2015
- R. antrifimi Ko et al. 2015
- R. artemisiae Zhao et al. 2012
- "R. australis" Hiddema et al. 1985
- "R. boritolerans" Lin et al. 2012
- R. canchipurensis Nimaichand et al. 2013
- R. cavernicola Lee et al. 2020
- R. cerastii Kämpfer et al. 2013
- R. cercidiphylli Li et al. 2012
- R. chubuensis Tsukamura 1983
- R. coprophilus Rowbotham and Cross 1979 (Approved Lists 1980)
- R. corynebacterioides (Serrano et al. 1972) Yassin and Schaal 2005
- "R. daqingensis" Wang et al. 2019
- R. defluvii Kämpfer et al. 2014
- R. electrodiphilus Ramaprasad et al. 2018
- R. equi (Magnusson 1923) Goodfellow and Alderson 1977 (Approved Lists 1980)
- R. erythropolis (Gray and Thornton 1928) Goodfellow and Alderson 1979 (Approved Lists 1980)
- R. fascians (Tilford 1936) Goodfellow 1984
- R. gannanensis Ma et al. 2017
- R. globerulus Goodfellow et al. 1985
- R. gordoniae Jones et al. 2004
- R. humicola Nguyen and Kim 2016
- R. jostii Takeuchi et al. 2002 (Note: Rhodococcus jostii was identified as producing a lignin digesting enzyme—the first isolated from a bacterium rather than a fungus.)
- R. koreensis Yoon et al. 2000
- "R. kronopolitis" Liu et al. 2014
- R. kroppenstedtii Mayilraj et al. 2006
- R. kyotonensis Li et al. 2007
- R. lactis Singh et al. 2015
- R. maanshanensis Zhang et al. 2002
- R. marinonascens Helmke and Weyland 1984
- R. nanhaiensis Li et al. 2012
- R. obuensis Tsukamura 1983
- R. olei Chaudhary and Kim 2018
- R. opacus Klatte et al. 1995
- R. oryzae Li et al. 2020
- R. pedocola Nguyen and Kim 2016
- R. phenolicus Rehfuss and Urban 2006
- "R. psychrotolerans" Silva et al. 2018
- R. pyridinivorans Yoon et al. 2000

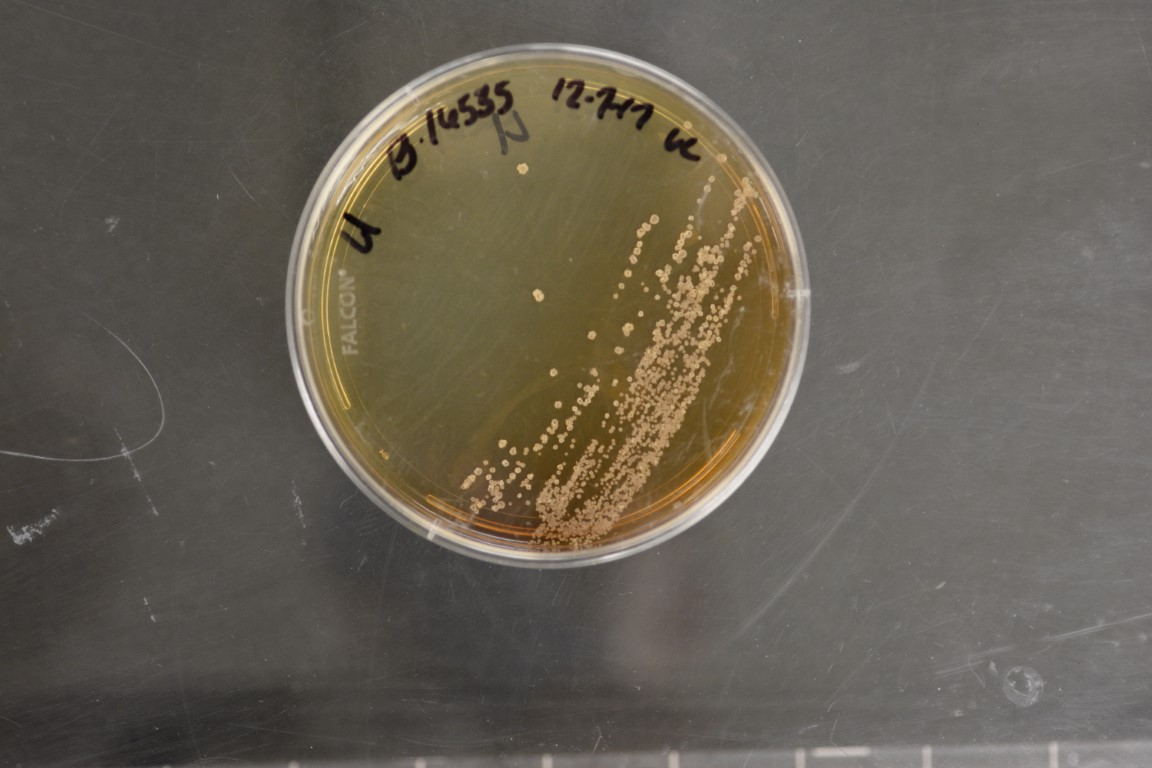
Rhodococcus rhodnii on agar plate

- R. rhodnii Goodfellow and Alderson 1979 (Approved Lists 1980)
- R. rhodochrous (Zopf 1891) Tsukamura 1974 (Approved Lists 1980)
- R. ruber (Kruse 1896) Goodfellow and Alderson 1977 (Approved Lists 1980)
- R. soli Li et al. 2015
- R. sovatensis Táncsics et al. 2017
- R. spelaei Lee and Kim 2021
- R. spongiicola Zhang et al. 2021
- R. subtropicus Lee et al. 2019
- R. triatomae Yassin 2005
- R. trifolii Kämpfer et al. 2013
- R. tukisamuensis Matsuyama et al. 2003
- R. wratislaviensis (Goodfellow et al. 1995) Goodfellow et al. 2002
- R. xishaensis Zhang et al. 2021
- R. yunnanensis Zhang et al. 2005

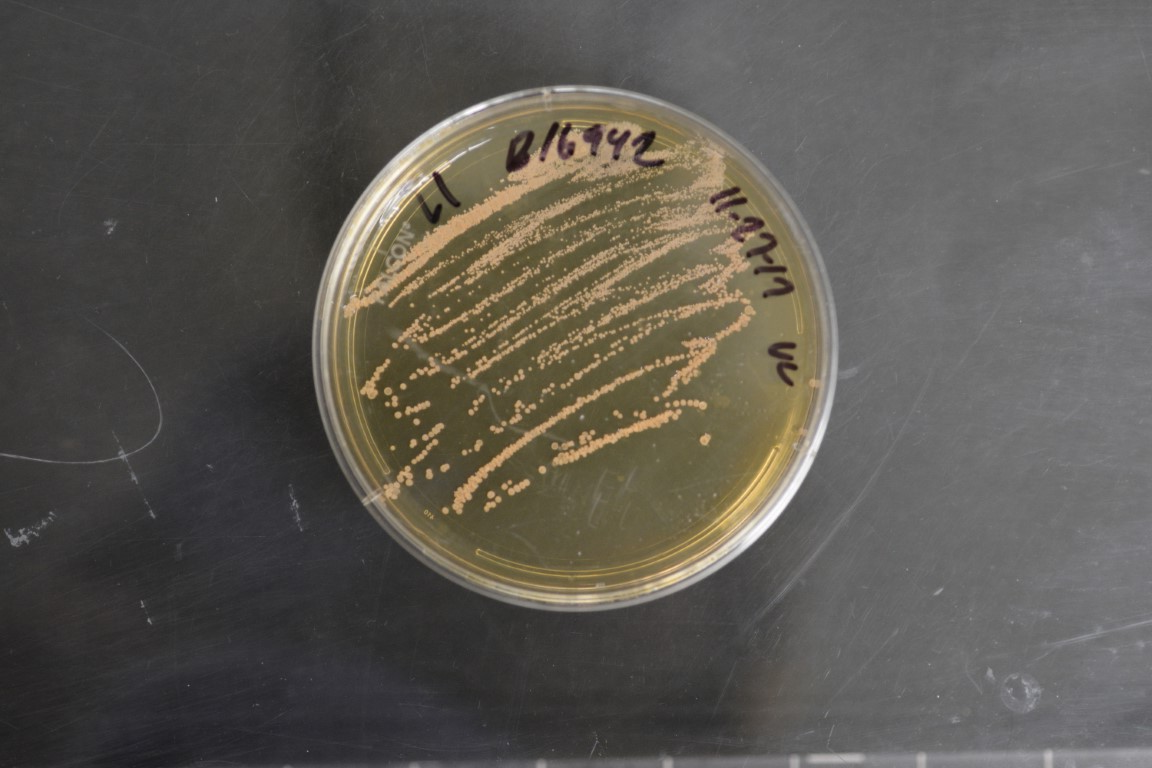
Rhodococcus zopfii on agar plate

- R. zopfii Stoecker et al. 1994
