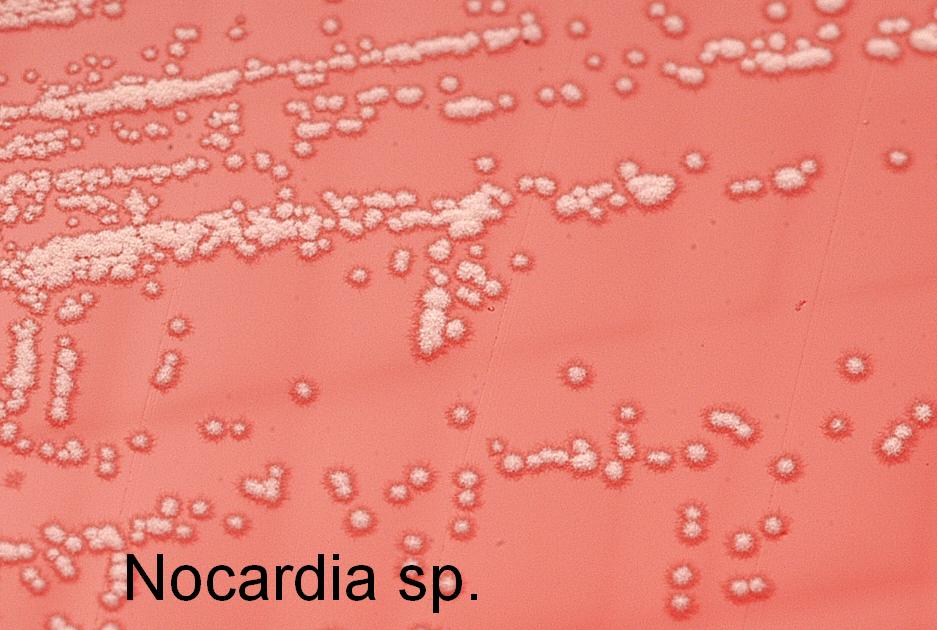
- Close-up image of a Nocardia species culture on sheep blood agar

Scientific classification
- Domain: Bacteria
- Kingdom: Bacillati
- Phylum: Actinomycetota
- Class: Actinomycetes
- Order: Mycobacteriales
- Family: Nocardiaceae
- Genus: Nocardia; Trevisan 1889 (Approved Lists 1980)

Type species
- Nocardia asteroides (Eppinger 1891) Blanchard 1896 (Approved Lists 1980)

Species
- See text.

Synonyms
- Micropolyspora Lechevalier et al. 1961 (Approved Lists 1980); Asteroides Puntoni & Leonardi, 1935; Proactinomyces (K.Lehmann & Haag) H.L.Jensen, 1934

= Nocardia =

Genus of bacteria

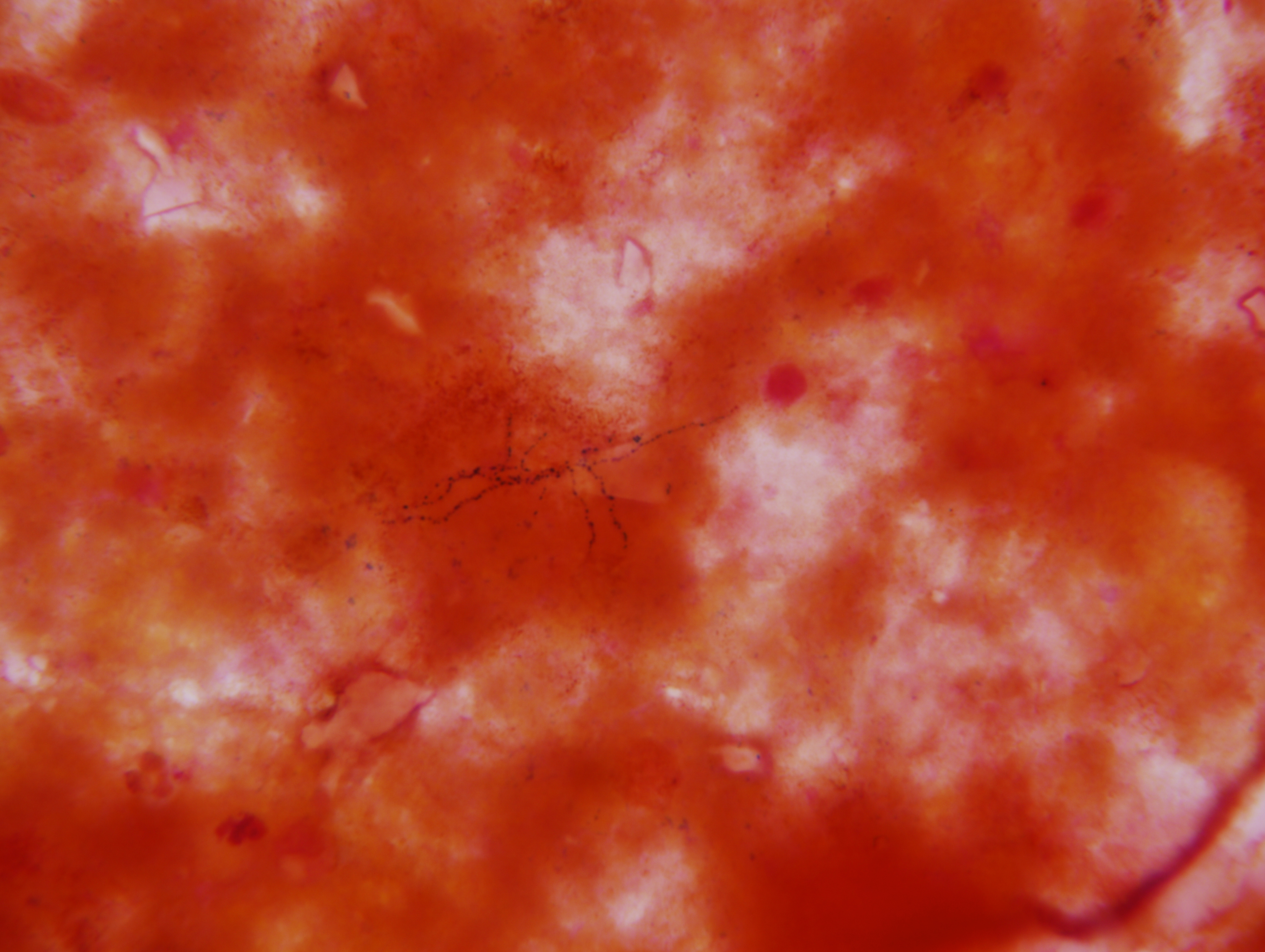
Nocardia as found on a brain biopsy.

Nocardia is a genus of weakly staining Gram-positive, catalase-positive, rod-shaped bacteria. Species from this genus form partially acid-fast beaded branching filaments (appearing similar to fungi, but being truly bacteria). It contains a total of 85 species. Some species are nonpathogenic, while others are responsible for nocardiosis. Nocardia species are found worldwide in soil rich in organic matter. In addition, they are oral microflora found in healthy human gingiva, as well as periodontal pockets. Most Nocardia infections are acquired by inhalation of the bacteria or through traumatic introduction through openings in epithelial barriers.

== Culture and staining ==
Nocardia colonies have a variable appearance, but most species appear to have aerial hyphae when viewed with a dissecting microscope, particularly when they have been grown on nutritionally limiting media. Nocardia grow slowly on nonselective culture media, and are strict aerobes with the ability to grow in a wide temperature range. Some species are partially acid-fast (meaning a less concentrated solution of sulfuric or hydrochloric acid should be used during the staining procedure) due to the presence of intermediate-length mycolic acids in their cell wall. Majority of strains possess the cord factor (trehalose 6-6' dimycolate), an important virulence factor.

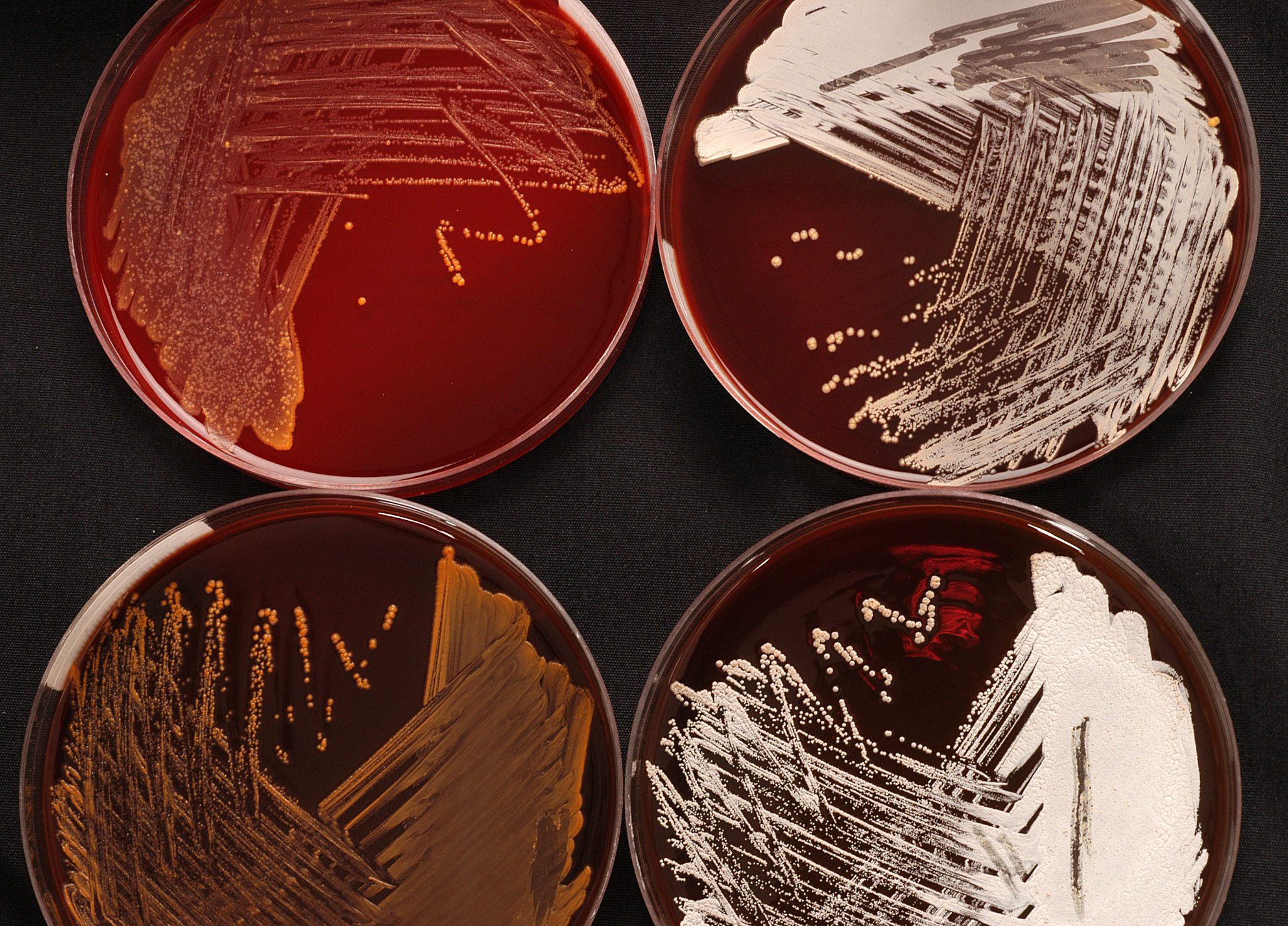
Four different Nocardia species on sheep blood agar demonstrating different colouring

They are catalase positive and can grow easily on the most commonly used media with colonies becoming evident in 3–5 days. However, prolonged incubation periods (2–3 weeks) are sometimes needed.

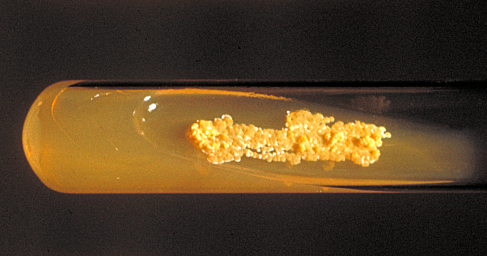
Nocardia asteroides

== Virulence ==
The various species of Nocardia are pathogenic bacteria with low virulence; therefore clinically significant disease most frequently occurs as an opportunistic infection in those with a weak immune system, such as small children, the elderly, and the immunocompromised (most typically, HIV). Nocardial virulence factors are the enzymes catalase and superoxide dismutase (which inactivate reactive oxygen species that would otherwise prove toxic to the bacteria), as well as a "cord factor" (which interferes with phagocytosis by macrophages by preventing the fusion of the phagosome with the lysosome).

An important virulence factor in many pathogenic strains of Nocardia is trehalose dimycolate, which is also found in the bacterial genus Mycobacterium. This toxin can cause cachexia, a form of muscle wasting.

== Clinical disease and microbiological diagnosis ==
The most commonly encountered species are Nocardia brasiliensis, Nocardia cyriacigeorgica, Nocardia farcinica, and Nocardia nova. Nocardia asteroides is most frequently found species causing noncutaneous invasive disease. Most cases occur as an opportunistic infection in immunocompromised patients. N. brasiliensis is the most common species causing cutaneous nocardiosis. N. caviae is another species of medical interest. The genus is acid-fast to some degree, it stains only weakly Gram positive.

The most common form of human nocardial disease is a slowly progressive pneumonia, the common symptoms of which include cough, dyspnea (shortness of breath), and fever. It is not uncommon for this infection to spread to the pleura or chest wall. Pre-existing pulmonary disease, especially pulmonary alveolar proteinosis, increases the risk of contracting a Nocardia pneumonia. Every organ can be affected if a systemic spread takes place.

Nocardia species are deeply involved in the process of encephalitis as one of its main pathogenic effects. In about 25–33% of people Nocardia infection takes the form of encephalitis and/or brain abscess formation. Nocardia may also cause a variety of cutaneous infections such as actinomycetoma (especially N. brasiliensis), lymphocutaneous disease, cellulitis, and subcutaneous abscesses.

Nocardia isolation from biological specimens can be performed using an agar medium enriched with yeast extract and activated charcoal (BCYE), the same used for Legionella species. Selective media for mycobacteria or fungi can also be inoculated. The most suitable specimens are the sputum, or when clinically necessary, bronchoalveolar lavage or biopsy. Further biochemical tests for species identification are not routinely performed. Serological or cutaneous tests are not available.

== Treatment ==
In most patients with Nocardia infection, the combination of antibiotics is needed. Antibiotic therapy with a sulfonamide, most commonly trimethoprim-sulfamethoxazole, is the treatment of choice. People who take trimethoprim-sulfamethoxazole for other reasons, such as prevention of Pneumocystis jirovecii infection, appear to have fewer Nocardia infections, although this protective effect has been considered unreliable, and some studies have disputed it altogether. Minocycline is usually substituted when a sulfa cannot be given; high-dose imipenem and amikacin have also been used in severe or refractory cases. Linezolid appears to be highly effective against Nocardia, but it is very expensive and may cause severe adverse effects.

Antibiotic therapy is continued for six months (in immunocompetent people) to a year (in immunosuppression), and may need to be continued indefinitely. Proper wound care is also critical.

== Genetics ==
Although Nocardia has interesting and important features such as production of antibiotics and aromatic compound-degrading or -converting enzymes, the genetic study of this organism has been hampered by the lack of genetic tools. However, practical Nocardia–E. coli shuttle vectors have been developed recently.

The genera Nocardia and Rhodococcus have been found to be closely related, supported by two conserved signature indels consisting of a one-amino-acid deletion in the alpha subunit of acetyl coenzyme A carboxylase (ACC), and a three-amino-acid insertion in a conserved region of an ATP-binding protein that are specifically shared by species from these two genera. In addition, 14 hypothetical conserved signature proteins have been identified which are unique to the genera Nocardia and Rhodococcus.

== Species ==
Nocardia comprises the following species:

- N. abscessus Yassin et al. 2000
- N. acididurans Sirireung et al. 2021
- N. aciditolerans Golinska et al. 2013
- N. acidivorans Kämpfer et al. 2007
- N. africana Hamid et al. 2001
- N. alba Li et al. 2004
- N. albiluteola Shan et al. 2022
- "N. alni" Nouioui et al. 2022
- N. altamirensis Jurado et al. 2008
- N. amamiensis Yamamura et al. 2007
- N. amikacinitolerans Ezeoke et al. 2013
- N. anaemiae Kageyama et al. 2005
- N. aobensis Kageyama et al. 2005
- N. araoensis Kageyama et al. 2004
- "N. argentinensis" Cone et al. 1989
- N. arizonensis Lasker et al. 2017
- N. artemisiae Zhao et al. 2011
- N. arthritidis Kageyama et al. 2005
- N. asiatica Kageyama et al. 2004
- N. asteroides (Eppinger 1891) Blanchard 1896 (Approved Lists 1980)
- N. aurantia Benndorf et al. 2020
- N. aurantiaca Kanchanasin et al. 2020
- N. aurea Fang et al. 2019
- N. barduliensis Nouioui et al. 2021
- N. beijingensis Wang et al. 2001
- N. bhagyanarayanae corrig. Vaddavalli et al. 2014
- N. blacklockiae Conville et al. 2009
- "N. boironii" Gilquin et al. 2016
- N. bovistercoris Zhang et al. 2021
- N. brasiliensis (Lindenberg 1909) Pinoy 1913 (Approved Lists 1980)
- N. brevicatena (Lechevalier et al. 1961) Goodfellow and Pirouz 1982
- N. caishijiensis Zhang et al. 2003
- N. calcarea Metcalfe and Brown 1957 (Approved Lists 1980)
- N. callitridis Kaewkla and Franco 2010
- N. camponoti Liu et al. 2016
- N. carnea (Rossi Doria 1891) Castellani and Chalmers 1913 (Approved Lists 1980)
- N. casuarinae Ghodhbane-Gtari et al. 2015
- N. cavernae Li et al. 2017
- N. cerradoensis Albuquerque de Barros et al. 2003
- N. coeliaca (Gray and Thornton 1928) Waksman and Henrici 1948 (Approved Lists 1980)
- N. coffeae Nammali et al. 2022
- N. colli Zhou et al. 2020
- N. concava Kageyama et al. 2005
- N. coubleae Rodríguez-Nava et al. 2007
- N. crassostreae Friedman et al. 1998
- N. cyriacigeorgica corrig. Yassin et al. 2001
- N. donostiensis Ercibengoa et al. 2020
- N. elegans Yassin and Brenner 2005
- N. endophytica Xing et al. 2011
- N. exalbida Iida et al. 2006
- N. farcinica Trevisan 1889 (Approved Lists 1980)
- N. flavorosea Chun et al. 1998
- N. fluminea Maldonado et al. 2001
- N. gamkensis Le Roes and Meyers 2007
- N. gipuzkoensis Nouioui et al. 2021
- N. globerula (Gray 1928) Waksman and Henrici 1948 (Approved Lists 1980)
- N. goodfellowii Sazak et al. 2012
- N. grenadensis Kämpfer et al. 2012
- N. halotolerans Nikou et al. 2015
- N. harenae Seo and Lee 2006
- N. heshunensis Huang et al. 2017
- N. higoensis Kageyama et al. 2004
- N. huaxiensis Zhuang et al. 2021
- N. ignorata Yassin et al. 2001
- N. inohanensis Kageyama et al. 2004
- N. iowensis Lamm et al. 2009
- N. jejuensis Lee 2006
- N. jiangsuensis Bai et al. 2016
- N. jiangxiensis Cui et al. 2005
- N. jinanensis Sun et al. 2009
- N. kroppenstedtii Jones et al. 2014
- N. kruczakiae Conville et al. 2005
- N. lasii Liu et al. 2017
- "N. levis" Kavitha et al. 2009
- N. lijiangensis Xu et al. 2006
- "N. lurida" Theriault et al. 1986
- N. macrotermitis Benndorf et al. 2020
- N. mangyaensis Yang et al. 2019
- N. mexicana Rodríguez-Nava et al. 2006
- N. mikamii Jannat-Khah et al. 2010
- N. miyunensis Cui et al. 2005
- N. neocaledoniensis Saintpierre-Bonaccio et al. 2004
- N. nepalensis Aryal et al. 2025
- N. niigatensis Kageyama et al. 2004
- N. ninae Laurent et al. 2007
- N. niwae Moser et al. 2011
- "N. noduli" Nouioui et al. 2022
- N. nova Tsukamura 1983
- N. otitidiscaviarum corrig. Snijders 1924 (Approved Lists 1980)
- "N. panacis" Hu et al. 2020
- "N. paratuberculosis" Tsukamura 1982
- N. paucivorans Yassin et al. 2000
- "N. phenotolerans" Yassin et al. 1988
- N. pigrifrangens Wang et al. 2004
- N. pneumoniae Kageyama et al. 2004
- N. polyresistens Xu et al. 2005
- N. pseudobrasiliensis Ruimy et al. 1996
- N. pseudovaccinii Kim et al. 2002
- N. puris Yassin et al. 2003
- N. rayongensis Tanasupawat et al. 2016
- N. rhamnosiphila Everest et al. 2012
- N. rhizosphaerae Wang et al. 2015
- N. rhizosphaerihabitans Ding et al. 2018
- N. salmonicida (ex Rucker 1949) Isik et al. 1999
- N. seriolae Kudo et al. 1988
- N. shimofusensis Kageyama et al. 2004
- N. shinanonensis Matsumoto et al. 2016
- N. sienata corrig. Kageyama et al. 2004
- "N. simplex" Jirasripongpun 2002
- N. speluncae Seo et al. 2007
- N. stercoris Zhao et al. 2020
- "N. suismassiliense" Fellag et al. 2018
- N. sungurluensis Camas et al. 2014
- N. takedensis Yamamura et al. 2005
- N. tenerifensis Kämpfer et al. 2004
- N. tengchongensis Li et al. 2017
- N. terpenica Hoshino et al. 2007
- "N. terrae" Kanchanasin et al. 2021
- N. testacea corrig. Kageyama et al. 2004
- N. thailandica Kageyama et al. 2005
- N. thraciensis Sazak et al. 2012
- N. transvalensis Pijper and Pullinger 1927 (Approved Lists 1980)
- N. uniformis (ex Marton and Szabó 1959) Isik et al. 1999
- N. vaccinii Demaree and Smith 1952 (Approved Lists 1980)
- N. vermiculata Kageyama et al. 2005
- N. veterana Gürtler et al. 2001
- N. vinacea Kinoshita et al. 2002
- N. vulneris Lasker et al. 2015
- N. wallacei Conville et al. 2009
- N. xestospongiae Thawai et al. 2017
- N. xishanensis Zhang et al. 2004
- N. yamanashiensis Kageyama et al. 2004
- N. yunnanensis Zhang et al. 2019
- N. zapadnayensis Ozdemir-Kocak et al. 2016
- N. zhihengii Huang et al. 2019
- N. sachiae Howlett et al. 2026

== Nomenclature ==
The genus was named for Edmond Nocard (1850–1903), a French veterinarian and biologist.

The genus was circumscribed in 1888 by Vittore Benedetto Antonio Trevisan di Saint-Léon in Annales de l'Institut Pasteur volume 2 (Issue 6) on page 295.
