= Nocardiosis =

- Specialty: Infectious diseases

Nocardiosis is an infectious disease affecting either the lungs (pulmonary nocardiosis) or the whole body (systemic nocardiosis). It is due to infection by a bacterium of the genus Nocardia, most commonly Nocardia asteroides or Nocardia brasiliensis.

It is most common in adult immunocompromised males. In patients with brain involvement, mortality exceeds 80%; in other forms, mortality is about 50%, even with appropriate therapy.

It is one of several conditions that have been called "the great imitator". Cutaneous nocardiosis commonly occurs in immunocompetent hosts and is caused in 80% of cases by Nocardia brasiliensis.

== Signs and symptoms ==
Pulmonary infection

- Subacute to chronic progressive pneumonia
- Night sweats, fever, cough with chest pain
- Symptoms are more severe in immunocompromised individuals
- Radiologic studies show multiple necrotic pulmonary infiltrates

Neurological infection

- Headache, lethargy, confusion, seizures, sudden onset of neurological deficits
- CT scan shows one or more cerebral abscesses
- Is often difficult to diagnose
- Serious risk of death

Cardiac conditions

- In recorded cases, it has caused damage to heart valves whether natural or prosthetic

Lymphocutaneous disease

- Nocardial cellulitis is akin to erysipelas but is less aggressive
- Lymphocutaneous nocardiosis mimics the fungal infection sporotrichosis with multiple nodules alongside a lymphatic vessel
- Persistent subcutaneous and deep bone infections have been recorded
- May be misidentified and treated as a S. aureus skin infection
- Cultures must incubate more than 48 hours to guarantee accuracy

Ocular disease

- Very rarely, these bacteria cause keratitis
- Generally there is a history of ocular trauma

Disseminated nocardiosis

- Disseminated infection can occur in very immunocompromised patients
- It generally involves both lung and brain abscesses
- Fever, moderate or very high can be seen
- Multiple cavitating necrotic pulmonary infiltrates develop
- Cerebral abscesses arise later
- Cutaneous lesions are very rarely seen
- Serious risk of death

== Causes ==
Normally found in soil, these organisms cause occasional sporadic disease in humans and animals throughout the world. Another well publicized find is that of Nocardia as part of the oral microflora. Nocardia spp. have been reported in the normal gingivae and periodontal pockets along with other species such as Actinomyces, Arthromyces and Streptomyces spp.

The usual mode of transmission is inhalation of organisms suspended in dust. Another very common method is by traumatic introduction, especially in the jaw. This leads to the entrance of Nocardia into the blood stream and the propagation of its pathogenic effects. Transmission by direct inoculation through puncture wounds or abrasions is less common. Immunosuppression can increase the chance for nocardial infection, along with trauma related to plants and soil.

A weakened immune system is a general indicator of a person who is more susceptible to nocardiosis, such as someone who already has a disease that weakens their immune system. Additionally, those with low T-cell counts or other complications involving T-cells can expect to have a higher chance of becoming infected. Besides those with weak immune systems, a local traumatic inoculation can cause nocardiosis, specifically the cutaneous, lymphocutaneous, and subcutaneous forms of the disease.

== Diagnosis ==
Diagnosis of nocardiosis can be made by a doctor using various techniques. These techniques include, but are not limited to: a chest x-ray to analyze the lungs, a bronchoscopy, a brain/lung/skin biopsy, or a sputum culture. However, diagnosis may be difficult. Nocardiae are gram positive, weakly acid-fast, branching rod-shaped bacteria and can be visualized by a modified Ziehl–Neelsen stain such as the Fite-Faraco method. In the clinical laboratory, routine cultures may be held for insufficient time to grow nocardiae, and referral to a reference laboratory may be needed for species identification. Pulmonary infiltration and pleural effusion are usually detected via x-ray.

== Treatment ==
Nocardiosis requires at least six months of treatment, preferably with trimethoprim/sulfamethoxazole or high doses of sulfonamides. In patients who do not respond to sulfonamide treatment, other drugs, such as ampicillin, erythromycin, or minocycline, may be added.

Treatment also includes surgical drainage of abscesses and excision of necrotic tissue. The acute phase requires complete bed rest; as the patient improves, activity can increase.

A new combination drug therapy (trimethoprim/sulfamethoxazole, ceftriaxone, and amikacin) has also shown promise.

== Prognosis ==
The prognosis of nocardiosis is highly variable. The state of the host's health, site, duration, and severity of the infection all play parts in determining the prognosis. Currently, skin and soft tissue infections have a 100% cure rate, and pleuropulmonary infections have a 90% cure rate with appropriate therapy. The cure rate falls to 63% with those infected with disseminated nocardiosis, with only half of patients surviving infections that cause brain abscess. Additionally, 44% of people who are infected in the central nervous system (CNS) die, increasing to 85% if that person has an already weakened immune system. There are no preventative treatments for nocardiosis. The only recommendation is to protect open wounds to limit entrance of the bacterium.

== Epidemiology ==
Although there are no international data available on worldwide infection rates per year, there are roughly 500–1000 documented cases of nocardiosis per year in the US. Most of these cases occur in men, as there is a 3:1 ratio of male of female cases annually; however, this difference may be due to exposure frequency rather than susceptibility differences. From an age perspective, it is not highly more prevalent in one age group than another. Cutaneous nocardiosis is slightly more common in middle aged men, but as a whole, all age groups are susceptible. There is no racial pattern in the risk of becoming infected with nocardiosis.
