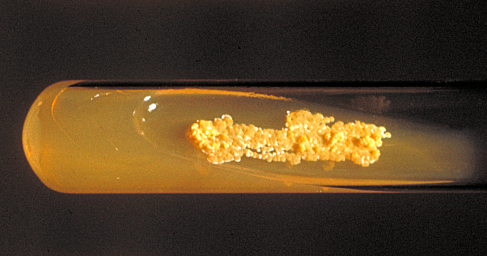
- Nocardia asteroides colonies

Scientific classification
- Domain: Bacteria
- Kingdom: Bacillati
- Phylum: Actinomycetota
- Class: Actinomycetes
- Order: Mycobacteriales
- Family: Nocardiaceae; Castellani and Chalmers 1919 (Approved Lists 1980)

Type genus
- Nocardia Trevisan 1889 (Approved Lists 1980)

Genera
- Aldersonia Nouioui et al. 2018; Antrihabitans Lee et al. 2020; Hoyosella Jurado et al. 2009; Millisia Soddell et al. 2006; Nocardia Trevisan 1889 (Approved Lists 1980); Rhodococcus Zopf 1891 (Approved Lists 1980); Skermania Chun et al. 1997; Smaragdicoccus Adachi et al. 2007; Tomitella Katayama et al. 2010

Synonyms
- Hoyosellaceae Salam et al. 2020; Tomitellaceae Salam et al. 2020

= Nocardiaceae =

Family of bacteria

The Nocardiaceae are a family of aerobic, non-fastidious, high G+C, Gram-positive actinomycetes that are commonly found in soil and water. Members of this family have been isolated from Antarctic soils. Nocardiaceae present coccobacilli, filamentous or, rarely, fragmented and palisading forms, and filamentous species grow in a branching morphological pattern similar to fungal hyphae.

== Genomics ==
The Nocardiaceae form a monophyletic clade within the Corynebacteriales in both 16S rRNA and protein-based phylogenetic trees. A number of conserved signature indels and conserved signature proteins have been identified which are uniquely found in the genera Nocardia and Rhodococcus, supporting a close relationship between the two genera. Recent proposals have been made, based on 16S rRNA signature nucleotides and chemotaxonomic markers, to add the genera Gordonia, Skermania, Williamsia, Millisia, and Smaragdicoccus to the family Nocardiaceae. However, no conserved signature indels or proteins have been found that are commonly shared by Nocardia, Rhodococcus, and Gordonia, the fully sequenced members of the proposed Nocardiaceae revision.

== Pathogenic capacity ==
Some species colonize animals, and members of the Nocardia and Rhodococcus genera can cause infection in humans and livestock. Nocardiosis represent also a serious health problem for fish (marine or not). Many members of this family integrate mycolic acids into their cell wall, and as a result, Nocardia spp. may be mistaken for mycobacteria when viewed under a microscope following an acid-fast stain.

== Environmental effects ==
=== Wastewater foaming ===
Nocardia species are often responsible for the accumulation of foam that occurs in activated sludge during sewage treatment. Biological foaming can be problematic for the water treatment process, and foam accumulation is reduced by adding surfactants to the wastewater.

=== Bioremediation of hydrocarbons ===
Soil Nocardiaceae can degrade hydrocarbons (e.g. petroleum distillates) and have been proposed as bioremediation agents for environmental spills.

== Nomenclature changes ==
In the 1980s, all Nocardiaceae species assigned to the genus Micropolyspora were transferred to the genera Nocardia or Nonomuraea in family Streptosporangiaceae, or Saccharopolyspora in family Pseudonocardiaceae. This effectively ended the official status of this genus, but the name persists in older research articles.
