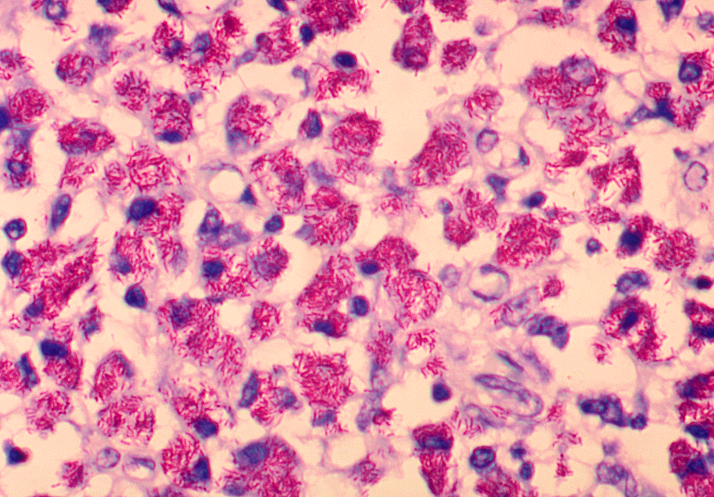

Scientific classification
- Domain: Bacteria
- Kingdom: Bacillati
- Phylum: Actinomycetota
- Class: Actinomycetes
- Order: Mycobacteriales
- Family: Mycobacteriaceae
- Genus: Mycobacterium
- Subgenus: Mycobacterium avium complex
- Species: M. avium
- Subspecies: M. a. subsp. avium

Trinomial name
- Mycobacterium avium subsp. avium (Chester 1901) Thorel et al. 1990

= Mycobacterium avium subsp. avium =

Species of bacterium

Mycobacterium subsp. avium is a subspecies of the phylum Actinomycetota, belonging to the genus Mycobacterium.

The subspecies name Mycobacterium avium subsp. avium Chester 1901 is automatically created by the valid publication of Mycobacterium avium subsp. paratuberculosis (Bergey et al. 1923) and the valid publication of Mycobacterium avium subsp. silvaticum Thorel et al. 1990.

Based on differences in IS1245 RFLP, 16S-23S rDNA ITS and growth temperature, Mijs et al. 2002 propose to reserve the designation Mycobacterium avium subsp. avium for bird-type isolates. These authors suggest, but do not formally propose, the designation "Mycobacterium avium subsp. hominissuis" for the isolates from humans and pigs.

== Epidemiology ==
Present mainly in cattle and humans with an immunocompromised disorder, e.g. AIDS, it is transmitted to man by drinking unpasteurized cow milk. Pigs are susceptible to M. avium avium , M. bovis, and M. tuberculosis, with M. avium being most common. Lesions are typically lymphoid, gastrointestinal, or rapidly progressive disseminated forms. Intradermal testing is the diagnostic test of choice. Isolation of purified protein derivatives is useful for M. bovis and M. tuberculosis. However, cross-reaction between M. avium avium, M. tuberculosis, or M. avium paratuberculosis is a disadvantage.

Dogs, cats, deer, mink, cattle, birds (serotypes 1, 2, and 3) and some cold-blooded animals are all also susceptible to M. avium.

False-negative tuberculin tests are common in dogs. Radiographs and a thorough history are useful in diagnosis. Affected dogs should be euthanized because of public health concerns.
