= Johne =

Johne is both a surname and a given name. Notable people with the name include:

== Surname ==
- Heinrich Albert Johne (1839–1910), German pathologist
- Karol de Johne (1890–1949), Polish literary critic
- Nick Johne (born 1955), Canadian actor

== Given name ==
- Johne Binkley (born 1953), politician in Alaska, USA
- Johne Murphy (born 1984), Irish rugby player
- Johné Parker, American mechanical engineer
- Johne Rotz, 16th-century French artist-cartographer
