= Mycobacterium avium-intracellulare infection =

- Other names: Mycobacterium avium complex infection, Lady Windermere syndrome
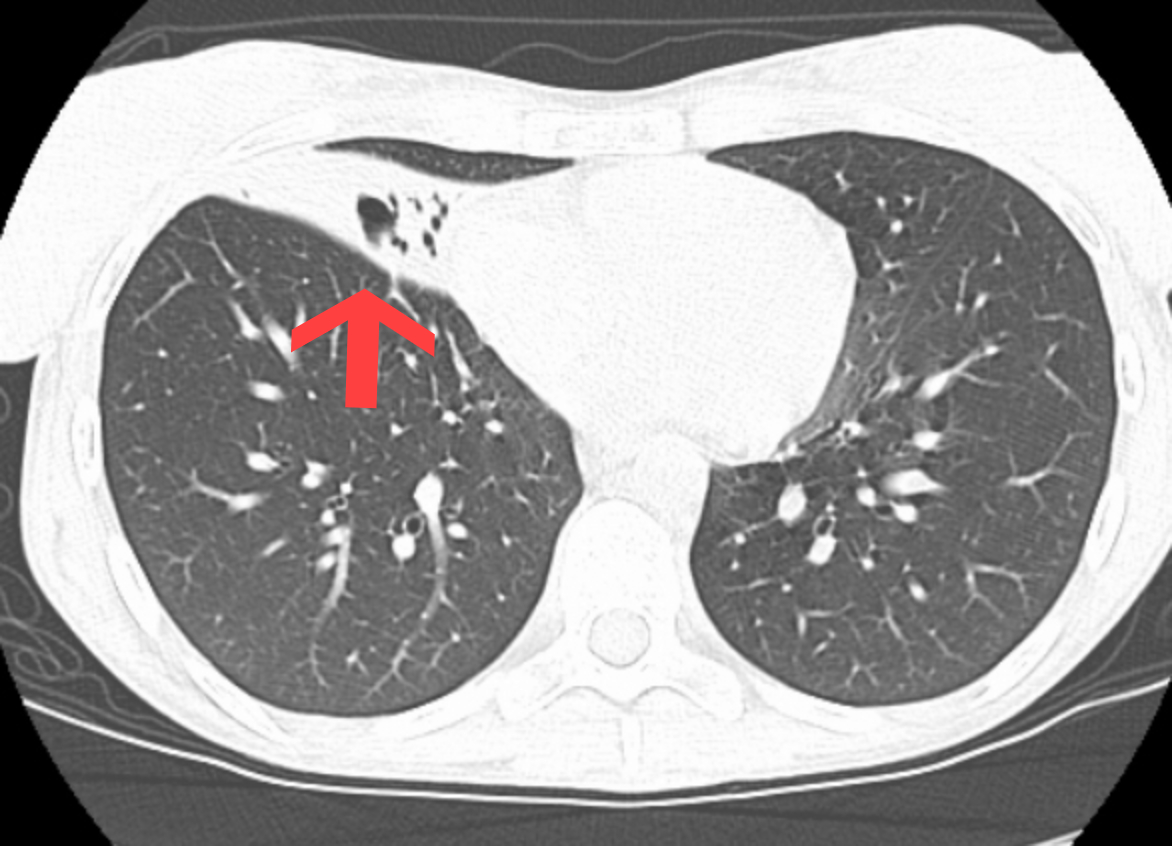
- CT scan of patient with right middle lobe aspiration and Mycobacterium avium infection.
- Specialty: Infectious diseases

Mycobacterium avium-intracellulare infection (MAI) is an atypical mycobacterial infection, i.e. one with nontuberculous mycobacteria or NTM, caused by Mycobacterium avium complex (MAC), which is made of two Mycobacterium species, M. avium and M. intracellulare. This infection causes respiratory illness in birds, pigs, and humans, especially in immunocompromised people. In the later stages of AIDS, it can be very severe. It usually first presents as a persistent cough. It is typically treated with a series of three antibiotics for a period of at least six months.

M. avium, M. intracellulare, and M. chimaera are each saprotrophic organisms present in soil and water; entry into hosts is usually via the gastrointestinal tract, but also can be via the lungs.

MAC infections can cause fevers, diarrhea, malabsorption, as well as loss of appetite and weight loss, and can disseminate to the bone marrow. MAI is typically resistant to standard mycobacterial therapies.

== Signs and symptoms ==
Pulmonary involvement symptoms are similar to tuberculosis (TB), and include fever, fatigue, weight loss, and coughing up blood. Diarrhea and abdominal pain are associated with gastrointestinal involvement.

=== Children ===
Mycobacterium avium and M. haemophilum infections in children form a distinct clinical entity, not associated with abnormalities of the immune system. M. avium typically causes unilateral swelling of one of the lymph nodes of the neck. This node is firm at the beginning, but a 'collar-stud' abscess is formed eventually, which is a characteristic blue-purple in colour with multiple discharging sinuses. The treatment of choice is surgical excision of the affected lymph nodes, with antibiotic treatment (usually clarithromycin and rifabutin for 18 to 24 months) reserved for those patients who cannot have surgery.

== Cause ==
MAC bacteria are common in the environment and cause infection when inhaled or swallowed. Recently, M. avium has been found to deposit and grow in bathroom shower heads from which it may be easily aerosolized and inhaled.

=== Bacteria ===
Mycobacterium avium complex (MAC), also called Mycobacterium avium-intracellulare complex, is a microbial complex of three Mycobacterium species (i.e. M. avium, M. intracellulare, and M. chimaera). It causes Mycobacterium avium-intracellulare infection. Some sources also include Mycobacterium avium subsp. paratuberculosis (MAP).

== Risk factors ==
MAI is common in immunocompromised individuals, including senior citizens and those with HIV/AIDS or cystic fibrosis. Bronchiectasis, the bronchial condition which causes pathological enlargement of the bronchial tubes, is commonly found with MAI infection. Whether the bronchiectasis leads to the MAC infection or is the result of it is not always known.

The Mycobacterium avium complex (MAC) includes common atypical bacteria, i.e. nontuberculous mycobacteria (NTM), found in the environment which can infect people with HIV and low CD4 cell count (below 100/microliter); mode of infection is usually inhalation or ingestion.

MAC causes disseminated disease in up to 40% of people with HIV in the United States, producing fever, sweats, weight loss, and anemia. Disseminated MAC (DMAC) characteristically affects people with advanced HIV disease and peripheral CD4 cell counts less than 50 cells/uL. Effective prevention and therapy of MAC has the potential to contribute substantially to improved quality of life and duration of survival for HIV-infected persons.

== Pathophysiology ==
MAC is the most commonly found form of nontuberculous mycobacteria.

Immunodeficiency is not a requirement for infection.

MAC usually affects patients with abnormal lungs or bronchi. However, Jerome Reich and Richard Johnson describe a series of six patients with MAC infection of the right middle lobe or lingula who did not have any predisposing lung disorders.

The right middle lobe and lingula of the lungs are served by bronchi that are oriented downward when a person is in the upright position. As a result, these areas of the lung may be more dependent upon vigorous voluntary expectoration (cough) for clearance of bacteria and secretions.

Since the six patients in their retrospective case series were older females, Reich and Johnson proposed that patients without a vigorous cough may develop right middle lobe or left lingular infection with MAC. They proposed this syndrome be named Lady Windermere syndrome, after the character Lady Windermere in Oscar Wilde's play Lady Windermere's Fan. However, little research has confirmed this speculative cause.

== Diagnosis ==
Diagnosis can be achieved through blood cultures or cultures of other bodily fluids such as sputum. Bone marrow culture can often yield an earlier diagnosis but is usually avoided as an initial diagnostic step because of its invasiveness. Many people will have anemia and neutropenia if the bone marrow is involved. MAC bacteria should always be considered in a person with HIV infection presenting with diarrhea.

The diagnosis requires consistent symptoms with two additional signs:

- Chest X-ray or CT scan showing evidence of right middle lobe (or left lingular lobe) lung infection
- Sputum culture or bronchoalveolar lavage culture demonstrating the infection is caused by MAC

Disseminated MAC is most readily diagnosed by one positive blood culture. Blood cultures should be performed in patients with symptoms, signs, or laboratory abnormalities compatible with mycobacterium infection. Blood cultures are not routinely recommended for asymptomatic persons, even for those who have CD4+ T-lymphocyte counts less than 100 cells/uL.

=== HIV infection ===
MAC in patients with HIV disease is theorized to represent recent acquisition rather than latent infection reactivating (which is the case in many other opportunistic infections in immunocompromised patients).

The risk of MAC is inversely related to the patient's CD4 count and increases significantly when the CD4 count decreases below 50 cells/mm³. Other risk factors for acquisition of MAC infection include using an indoor swimming pool, consumption of raw or partially cooked fish or shellfish, bronchoscopy and treatment with granulocyte stimulating factor. Disseminated disease was previously the common presentation prior to the advent of highly active antiretroviral therapy (HAART). Today, in regions where HAART is the standard of care, localized disease presentation is more likely. This generally includes a focal lymphadenopathy/lymphadenitis.

== Prevention ==
People with AIDS are given macrolide antibiotics such as azithromycin for prophylactic treatment.

People with HIV infection and less than 50 CD4 cells/uL should be administered prophylaxis against MAC. Prophylaxis should be continued for the patient's lifetime unless multiple drug therapy for MAC becomes necessary because of the development of MAC disease.

Clinicians must weigh the potential benefits of MAC prophylaxis against the potential for toxicities and drug interactions, the cost, the potential to produce resistance in a community with a high rate of tuberculosis, and the possibility that the addition of another drug to the medical regimen may adversely affect patients' compliance with treatment. Because of these concerns, therefore, in some situations rifabutin prophylaxis should not be administered.

Before prophylaxis is administered, patients should be assessed to ensure that they do not have the active disease due to MAC, M. tuberculosis, or any other mycobacterial species. This assessment may include a chest radiograph and tuberculin skin test.

Rifabutin, by mouth daily, is recommended for the people's lifetime unless disseminated MAC develops, which would then require multiple drug therapy. Although other drugs, such as azithromycin and clarithromycin, have laboratory and clinical activity against MAC, none has been shown in a prospective, controlled trial to be effective and safe for prophylaxis. Thus, in the absence of data, no other regimen can be recommended at this time. The 300-mg dose of rifabutin has been well tolerated. Adverse effects included neutropenia, thrombocytopenia, rash, and gastrointestinal disturbances.

== Treatment ==
Postinfection treatment involves a combination of antituberculosis antibiotics, including rifampicin, rifabutin, ciprofloxacin, amikacin, ethambutol, streptomycin, clarithromycin or azithromycin.

NTM infections are usually treated with a three-drug regimen of either clarithromycin or azithromycin, plus rifampicin and ethambutol. Treatment typically lasts at least 12 months.

Although studies have not yet identified an optimal regimen or confirmed that any therapeutic regimen produces sustained clinical benefit for patients with disseminated MAC, the Task Force concluded that the available information indicated the need for treatment of disseminated MAC. The Public Health Service, therefore, recommends that regimens be based on the following principles:

- Treatment regimens outside a clinical trial should include at least two agents.
- Every regimen should contain either azithromycin or clarithromycin; many experts prefer ethambutol as a second drug. Many clinicians have added one or more of the following as second, third, or fourth agents: clofazimine, rifabutin, rifampin, ciprofloxacin, and in some situations amikacin. Isoniazid and pyrazinamide are not effective for the therapy of MAC.
- Therapy should continue for the lifetime of the patient if the clinical and microbiologic improvement is observed.

Clinical manifestations of disseminated MAC—such as fever, weight loss, and night sweats—should be monitored several times during the initial weeks of therapy. The microbiologic response, as assessed by blood culture every 4 weeks during initial therapy, can also be helpful in interpreting the efficacy of a therapeutic regimen. Most patients who ultimately respond show substantial clinical improvement in the first 4–6 weeks of therapy. Elimination of the organism from blood cultures may take somewhat longer, often requiring 4–12 weeks.

=== HIV-infected children ===
HIV-infected children less than 12 years of age also develop disseminated MAC. Some age adjustment is necessary when clinicians interpret CD4+ T-lymphocyte counts in children less than 2 years of age. Diagnosis, therapy, and prophylaxis should follow recommendations similar to those for adolescents and adults.

== Society and culture ==
"Lady Windermere syndrome" is an outdated term that refers to an infection in the lungs caused by MAC. It is a reference to Oscar Wilde's 1892 play Lady Windermere's Fan.

In more recent years, some have described the eponym as inappropriate, and some have noted that it would have been unlikely that Lady Windermere had the condition to which her name was assigned.

The more commonly used term is nontuberculous mycobacteria (NTM) infection, or non-tuberculous mycobacterial infection (NMI). There is no evidence that a person's reluctance to spit has any causal role in NTM infection, the chief reason for the term having been applied to older women presenting with the condition.

The original Chest article proposing the existence and pathophysiology of the Lady Windermere syndrome suggested the character Lady Windermere in Oscar Wilde's Victorian-era play Lady Windermere's Fan is a good example of the behavior believed to cause the syndrome. The article states:

We offer the term, Lady Windermere's Syndrome, from the Victorian-era play, Lady Windermere's Fan, to convey the fastidious behavior hypothesized: "How do you do, Lord Darlington. No, I can't shake hands with you. My hands are all wet with the roses."

Victorian women presumably believed "ladies don't spit," and consequently might have been predisposed to develop lung infection.

Shortly after the Lady Windermere syndrome was proposed, a librarian wrote a letter to the editor of Chest challenging the use of Lady Windermere as the eponymous ancestor of the proposed syndrome. In the play, Lady Windermere is a vivacious young woman, married only two years, who never coughs or displays any other signs of illness. While her avoidance of shaking hands might be interpreted as "fastidiousness", two alternative explanations may be just as probable:

1) Lady Windermere actually is in the midst of arranging flowers and consequently cannot properly greet her guest:

[LADY WINDERMERE is at table R., arranging roses in a blue bowl.]

2) Lady Windermere wishes to discourage the flirtatious advances of her would-be suitor Lord Darlington and cites her wet hands as an excuse to keep him from touching her:

LADY WINDERMERE. Lord Darlington, you annoyed me last night at the Foreign Office. I am afraid you are going to annoy me again. . . .

LORD DARLINGTON. [Takes chair and goes across L.C.] I am quite miserable, Lady Windermere. You must tell me what I did. [Sits down at table L.]

LADY WINDERMERE. Well, you kept paying me elaborate compliments the whole evening.]

The scholars highlight the literary malapropism, but some in the medical community have adopted the term regardless, and peer-reviewed medical journals still sometimes mention the Lady Windermere syndrome, although it is increasingly viewed as a outdated and sexist term for a serious bacterial infection.

== See also ==
- Paratuberculosis
