= Paratuberculosis =

- Other names: Johne's disease
- Pronunciation: Johne's disease: /ˈjoʊnə/
- Specialty: Veterinary medicine

Paratuberculosis is a contagious, chronic and sometimes fatal infection that primarily affects the small intestine of ruminants. It is caused by the bacterium Mycobacterium avium subsp. paratuberculosis. Infections normally affect ruminants (mammals that have four compartments of their stomachs, of which the rumen is one), but have also been seen in a variety of nonruminant species, including rabbits, foxes, and birds. Horses, dogs, and nonhuman primates have been infected experimentally. Paratuberculosis is found worldwide, with some states in Australia (where it is usually called bovine Johne's disease or BJD) being the only areas proven to be free of the disease. At least in Canada, the signs of BJD usually start when cattle are four to seven years of age, and then usually only are diagnosed in one animal at a time. Cattle "with signs of Johne's disease shed billions of bacteria through their manure and serve as a major source of infection for future calves."

Some sources define "paratuberculosis" by the lack of Mycobacterium tuberculosis, rather than the presence of any specific infectious agent, leaving ambiguous the appropriateness of the term to describe Buruli ulcer or Lady Windermere syndrome.

== Bacterium ==
The disease, discovered by Heinrich A. Johne, a German bacteriologist and veterinarian, in 1905, is caused by a bacterium named Mycobacterium avium subsp. paratuberculosis, an acid-fast bacillus, often abbreviated MAP. MAP is akin to, but distinct from, Mycobacterium tuberculosis, the main cause of tuberculosis in humans, and Mycobacterium bovis, the main cause of tuberculosis in cattle and occasionally also in humans. MAP is 99% genetically related to Mycobacterium avium, but has different phenotypic characteristics, such as:

- slower growth
- requires the addition of an iron transport chemical known as mycobactin when grown in vitro
- forms a rough colony when grown on a solid agar medium
- Infects mammals instead of birds

Also, the environmental distribution of MAP is markedly different from that of M. avium, which can produce mycobactin, so can grow and multiply outside the body.

== Control ==
Pasteurization is used to kill the causal agent, M. paratuberculosis, by heating cow's milk for a short time and then immediately cooling it.

== Signs and symptoms ==
In cattle, the main signs of paratuberculosis are diarrhea and wasting. Most cases are seen in 2- to 6-year-old animals. The initial signs can be subtle, and may be limited to weight loss, decreased milk production, or roughening of the hair coat. The diarrhea is usually thick, without blood, mucus, or epithelial debris, and may be intermittent. Several weeks after the onset of diarrhea, a soft swelling may occur under the jaw. Known as "bottle jaw" or intermandibular edema, this symptom is due to protein loss from the bloodstream into the digestive tract. Paratuberculosis is progressive; affected animals become increasingly emaciated and usually die as the result of dehydration and severe cachexia.

Signs are rarely evident until two or more years after the initial infection, which usually occurs shortly after birth. Animals are most susceptible to the infection in the first year of life. Newborns most often become infected by swallowing small amounts of infected manure from the birthing environment or udder of the mother. In addition, newborns may become infected while in the uterus or by swallowing bacteria passed in milk and colostrum. Animals exposed at an older age, or exposed to a very small dose of bacteria at a young age, are not likely to develop clinical disease until they are much older than two years.

The clinical signs are similar in other ruminants. In sheep and goats, the wool or hair is often damaged and easily shed, and diarrhea is uncommon. In deer, paratuberculosis can progress rapidly. Intestinal disease has also been reported in rabbits and nonhuman primates.

Unlike cattle and sheep, infections in deer often present with clinical illness in animals under one year of age.

== Pathophysiology ==
The primary site targeted by Johne's disease is the lower part of the intestine known as the ileum. The wall of the ileum contains a large number of pockets of lymphoid tissue known as Peyer's patches that lie just beneath the interior surface of the intestine. Peyer's patches are clusters of macrophages and lymphocytes organized much like lymph nodes. Covering Peyer's patches are a layer of cells called M cells. These cells function to sample the content of the lumen of the intestines and pass antigens (bacteria) through to the underlying cells of the Peyer's patch to "show" these antigens to the macrophages and lymphocytes. This is a means of "educating" the cells in a young animal about its environment, and is a protective mechanism designed to help the animal become immune to pathogens in its environment.

Unfortunately, when M cells bring M. paratuberculosis to the Peyer's patch, the bacteria find an ideal place for growth. Macrophages in Peyer's patches engulf M. paratuberculosis for the purpose of destroying the foreign invader, but for reasons yet unclear, these macrophages fail to do this. Inside a macrophage, M. paratuberculosis multiplies until it eventually kills the cell, spreads, and infects other nearby cells. In time, other parts of the ileum and other regions of the body are teeming with millions of the mycobacteria. How M. paratuberculosis neutralizes or evades the normally efficient bacterial killing mechanisms of the macrophages is unknown, although the unusually resistant cell wall of mycobacteria likely plays an important role.

The animal's immune system reacts to the M. paratuberculosis invasion by recruiting more macrophages and lymphocytes to the site of the infection. The lymphocytes release a variety of chemicals signals, called cytokines, in an attempt to increase the bacterial killing power of the macrophages. Macrophages fuse together, forming large cells, called multinucleated giant cells, in an apparent attempt to kill the mycobacteria. Infiltration of infected tissues with millions of lymphocytes and macrophages leads to visible thickening of the intestines. This prevents nutrient absorption, and diarrhea results. Late in the infection, antibody production by the animal occurs to M. paratuberculosis in serum of animals, and is an indicator that clinical signs of disease and death from the infection will soon follow.

For goats infected with this disease, the most apparent sign of having it is their bodies wasting away, even with a sufficient diet. If a goat develops Johne's and it has diarrhea, it is most likely going to die. When it has diarrhea, the goat is at the last stages of the disease. Herds should be tested once or twice a year to maintain the health and keep out the disease.

== Morbidity and mortality ==
In an endemic herd, only a minority of the animals develops clinical signs; most animals either eliminate the infection or become asymptomatic carriers. The mortality rate is about 1%, but up to 50% of the animals in the herd can be asymptomatically infected, resulting in losses in production. Once the symptoms appear, paratuberculosis is progressive and affected animals eventually die. The percentage of asymptomatic carriers that develop overt disease is unknown.

== Human risks ==
MAP is capable of causing Johne's-like symptoms in humans, though difficulty in testing for MAP infection presents a diagnostic hurdle.

As of October 2019, neither the World Health Organization nor any individual nation had declared Johne's disease to be zoonotic.

Clinical similarities are seen between Johne's disease in ruminants and inflammatory bowel disease in humans, and because of this, some researchers contend the organism is causative factor in Crohn's disease. However, epidemiologic studies have provided variable results; in certain studies, the organism (or an immune response directed against it) has been much more frequently found in patients with Crohn's disease than asymptomatic people.

== Action and regulations ==
Paratuberculosis is a reportable disease in some states of the US. US Federal regulations prohibit culture positive or DNA test-positive animals from being moved across state lines except for slaughter.
