= Mycobactin =

Siderophore used by members of the genus Mycobacterium

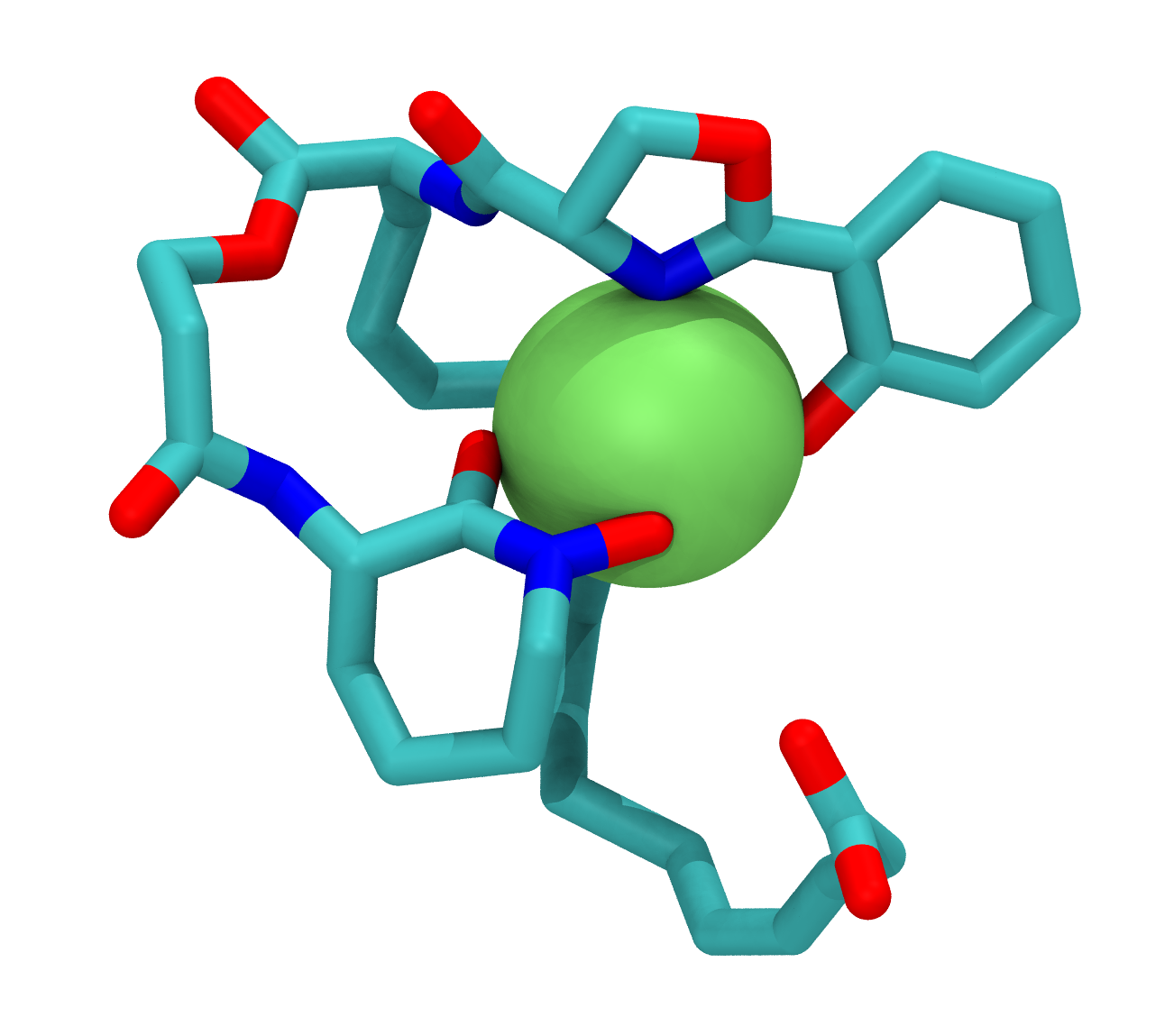
Molecular model of carboxymycobactin.

Mycobactin is a siderophore used by members of the genus Mycobacterium to shuttle free extracellular iron ions into the cytoplasm of mycobacterial cells. The pathogen M. tuberculosis can synthesize its own mycobactin for this purpose, however there are other mycobacteria such as M. avium subspecies paratuberculosis that cannot produce this siderophore and thus it must be supplied to cultivate this organism in the lab or in host organism.
