= Opportunistic infection =

Infection that develops from a pre-existing condition

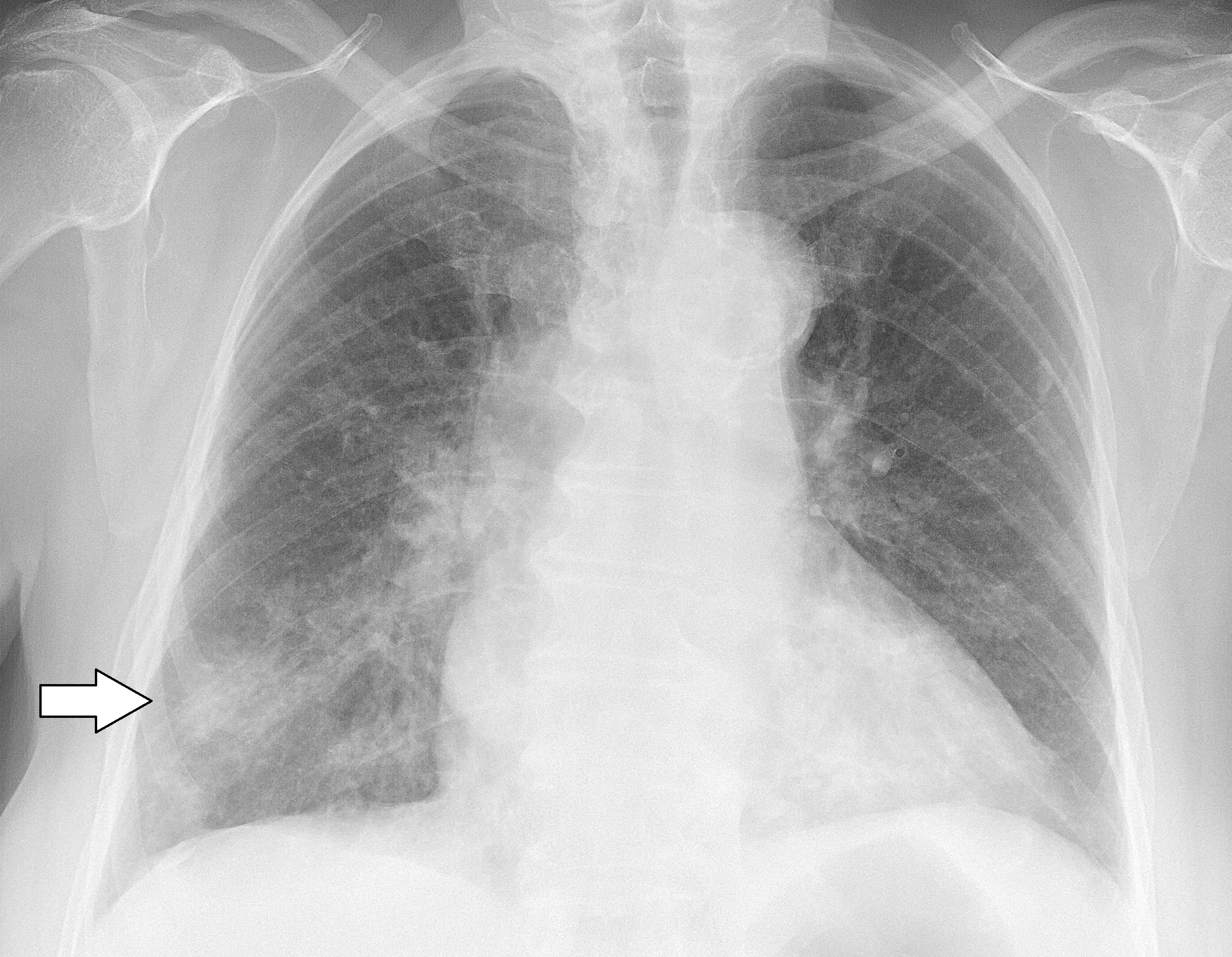
- Chest X-ray of a patient who first had influenza and then developed Haemophilus influenzae pneumonia, presumably opportunistic
- Specialty: Infectious diseases

An opportunistic infection is an infection that occurs most commonly in individuals with an immunodeficiency disorder and acts more severely on those with a weakened immune system. These types of infections are considered serious and can be caused by a variety of pathogens including viruses, bacteria, fungi, and parasites. Under normal conditions, such as in humans with uncompromised immune systems, an opportunistic infection would be less likely to cause significant harm and would typically result in a mild infection or no effect at all. These opportunistic infections can stem from a variety of sources, such as a weakened immune system (caused by human immunodeficiency virus and acquired immunodeficiency syndrome), when being treated with immunosuppressive drugs (as in cancer treatment), when a microbiome is altered (such as a disruption in gut microbiota), or when integumentary barriers are breached (as in penetrating trauma). Opportunistic infections can contribute to antimicrobial resistance in an individual making these infections more severe. Some pathogens that cause these infections possess intrinsic resistance (natural resistance) to many antibiotics while others acquire resistance over time through mutations or horizontal gene transfer. Many of these pathogens, such as the bacterium Clostridioides difficile (C. diff), can be present in hosts with uncompromised immune systems without generating any symptoms, and can, in some cases, act as commensals until the balance of the immune system is disrupted. With C. diff and many other pathogens, the overuse or misuse of antibiotics can cause the disruption of normal microbiota and lead to an opportunistic infection caused by antibiotic resistant pathogens. In some cases, opportunistic infections can be labeled as a hospital-acquired infection due to individuals contracting them within a healthcare/hospital setting. In terms of history, there is not one individual that can be attributed for discovering opportunistic infections. Over time and through medical advancement, there have been many scientists that have contributed to the study and treatment options for patients affected by these infections.

== Types of opportunistic infections ==
Opportunistic infections can be caused by a wide variety of different types of pathogens. These infections can be caused by viral, bacterial, fungal, as well as parasitic pathogens.

A partial list of opportunistic pathogens and their associated effects are as follows:

=== Bacteria ===
- Atopobium vaginae is an anaerobic bacterium recognized for its role in the development of bacterial vaginosis (BV).
- Clostridioides difficile (formerly known as Clostridium difficile) is a bacteria that is known to cause gastrointestinal infection and diarrhea. It is typically associated with being the most common hospital acquired infection.
- Cutibacterium acnes (formerly Propionibacterium acnes) can act as an opportunistic agent in infections associated with implanted medical devices, forming biofilms.
- Extraintestinal pathogenic Escherichia coli (ExPEC) are E. coli strains that can lead to diseases beyond the gut, notably urinary tract infections (UTIs), meningitis, and bacteremia (bloodstream infections).
- Haemophilus influenzae is a bacterium implicated in causing illnesses such as meningitis, epiglottitis which can obstruct airways, pneumonia, otitis media affecting the ear, sinusitis involving the sinuses, and potentially leading to complications like mastoiditis, parameningeal abscess, and pericarditis.
- Klebsiella pneumoniae, a member of a group including pathogens, can be responsible for various infections in hospitalized individuals as it is frequently isolated from hospital admissions and the broader group (Enterobacteriaceae) is known to cause diverse infections.
- Legionella pneumophila is a bacterium that causes Legionnaire's disease, a respiratory infection.
- Mycobacterium avium complex (MAC) is a group of two bacteria, M. avium and M. intracellulare, that typically co-infect, leading to a lung infection called mycobacterium avium-intracellulare infection.
- Mycobacterium tuberculosis is a species of bacteria that causes tuberculosis, a respiratory infection.
- Pseudomonas aeruginosa is a bacterium that can cause respiratory infections. It is frequently associated with nosocomial infections and cystic fibrosis which can lead to organ dysfunctions and shortened life expectancy.
- Salmonella is a genus of bacteria that is known to cause gastrointestinal infections causing an inflammatory response accompanied with fever and diarrhea.
- Staphylococcus aureus is a bacterium known to cause skin infections and sepsis, among other pathologies. Notably, S. aureus has evolved several drug-resistant strains, including MRSA.
- Stenotrophomonas maltophilia has emerged as a challenging nosocomial agent frequently associated with respiratory tract infections like pneumonia and exacerbations in individuals with COPD, and can also cause bacteremia, particularly linked to central lines in vulnerable patients.
- Streptococcus pneumoniae is a bacterium that causes respiratory infections as well as meningitis and bacteremia.
- Streptococcus pyogenes (also known as group A Streptococcus) is a bacterium that can cause a variety of conditions, including impetigo and strep throat, as well as other illnesses.

=== Fungi ===
- Aspergillus is a fungus, commonly associated with respiratory infection.
- Candida albicans is a species of fungus that is a part of the normal human microbiome. It acts as a commensal unless there is a change in concentrations. It can be associated with various conditions such as oral thrush and gastrointestinal infection.
- Coccidioides immitis is a fungus known for causing coccidioidomycosis, more commonly known as Valley Fever.
- Cryptococcus gattii: This emerging fungal pathogen can cause severe and often fatal infections, manifesting as pulmonary disease and meningitis in both immunocompromised and immunocompetent individuals.
- Cryptococcus neoformans is a fungus that causes cryptococcosis, which can lead to pulmonary infection as well as nervous system infections, like meningitis.
- Dematiaceous (pigmented) molds: These fungi are responsible for a range of diseases including phaeohyphomycosis, chromoblastomycosis, eumycotic mycetoma, invasive sinusitis, and allergic fungal sinusitis; cerebral infections can also occur.
- Fusarium species: These fungi can cause hyalohyphomycosis, particularly in immunocompromised individuals, as well as mycotic keratitis and onychomycosis.
- Hyaline (non-pigmented) molds (e.g., Acremonium, Paecilomyces, Scopulariopsis species): This group encompasses various molds, including Fusarium spp. causing hyalohyphomycosis, mycotic keratitis, and onychomycosis, as well as commonly causing pneumonia, sinusitis, and cutaneous lesions that may disseminate in neutropenic patients; Scedosporium spp. associated with sinusitis and pneumonia; Lomentospora prolificans causing a varied range of infections and disseminated disease; Scopulariopsis spp. and Acremonium spp. linked to sinopulmonary diseases; Paecilomyces variotii causing sinopulmonary disease; and Penicillium species implicated in necrotizing esophagitis and disseminated infections.
- Histoplasma capsulatum is a species of fungus known to cause histoplasmosis, which can present itself with an array of symptoms, but often involves respiratory infection.
- Lomentospora prolificans: This fungus can cause a remarkably varied range of infections and disseminated disease, including keratitis, mycotic aneurysms, external otitis, sinusitis, peritonitis, onychomycosis, and esophagitis.
- Pseudogymnoascus destructans (formerly known as Geomyces destructans) is a fungus that causes white-nose syndrome in bats.
- Microsporidia is a group of fungi that infect species across the animal kingdom, one species of which can cause microsporidiosis in immunocompromised human hosts.
- Pneumocystis jirovecii (formerly known as Pneumocystis carinii) is a fungus that causes pneumocystis pneumonia, a respiratory infection.
- Rhodotorula species: These yeasts can cause fungemia, often linked to central venous catheter use, as well as localized infections including meningitis, skin infections, ocular infections, peritonitis, and prosthetic joint infections.
- Zygomycetes (e.g., Mucor, Rhizopus, Absidia): This group can cause infections like rhinocerebral mucormycosis, and Mucor has been associated with respiratory infections; specifically, Absidia corymbifera is considered a human pathogen.

=== Protozoa ===
- Cryptosporidium is a protozoan that causes the condition Cryptosporidiosis. This condition affects the gastrointestinal tract.
- Toxoplasma gondii is a protozoan, known for causing toxoplasmosis which is known to lead to impairment of the brain.

=== Viruses ===
- Adenovirus is known to cause various illnesses, including lower respiratory tract infections, pneumonia, acute respiratory diseases, epidemic keratoconjunctivitis affecting the eyes, acute hemorrhagic cystitis of the bladder, and gastroenteritis affecting the digestive system.
- LCMV causes lymphocytic choriomeningitis disease and death in immunocompromised organ-transplant patients.
- HSV is considered a member of the human herpesvirus family and is most frequently associated with immunocompromisation diseases and JAK inhibitors.
- Cytomegalovirus is considered a member of the human herpesvirus family and is most frequently associated with respiratory infection.
- Hepatitis B virus can lead to acute liver infection manifesting as anicteric hepatitis, icteric hepatitis, or fulminant hepatitis, and chronic infection can progress to an asymptomatic carrier state, chronic hepatitis, cirrhosis of the liver, and hepatocellular carcinoma. Severe liver damage can result in complications like jaundice, hepatic encephalopathy, ascites, gastrointestinal bleeding, and coagulopathy.
- Hepatitis C virus infection can become chronic, leading to liver damage that can progress to cirrhosis, portal hypertension, hepatic decompensation with encephalopathy, and hepatocellular carcinoma.
- Influenza virus is responsible for seasonal flu epidemics and can be categorized into types affecting various hosts, such as avian (bird) flu, canine (dog) flu, swine (pig)/variant flu, and can cause pandemic flu, all generally resulting in respiratory illnesses.
- Human metapneumovirus commonly causes upper and lower respiratory tract infections, with symptoms such as cough, mucous production, fever, and dyspnea, and can lead to more severe conditions like pneumonia and bronchiolitis.
- Human papillomavirus is the initiating force behind multiple conditions, including cutaneous and anogenital warts, which in some cases can progress to various carcinomas.
- Human polyomavirus 2 (also known as JC virus) is known to cause progressive multifocal leukoencephalopathy (PML) which affects the central nervous system.
- Human herpesvirus 8 (also known as Kaposi sarcoma-associated herpesvirus) is a virus associated with Kaposi sarcoma, a type of skin cancer.
- Human T-cell leukemia virus type 1 causes a chronic lifelong infection that can lead to general immunosuppression, uveitis affecting the eyes, dermatitis of the skin, pneumonitis in the lungs, adult T-cell leukemia, and HTLV-1 associated myelopathy also known as tropical spastic paraparesis.
- Parainfluenza virus commonly causes upper and lower respiratory illnesses with symptoms similar to the common cold, such as fever, runny nose, cough, sneezing, and sore throat, and can also cause more serious illnesses in children including croup, bronchitis, and bronchiolitis.
- SARS-CoV-2 is the virus that causes Coronavirus Disease 2019 (COVID-19), with symptoms that can include fever, cough, fatigue, muscle or body aches, headache, new loss of taste or smell, sore throat, congestion or runny nose, nausea or vomiting, and diarrhea.
- Varicella-Zoster Virus causes shingles.

== Opportunistic infections and HIV/AIDS ==
Human immunodeficiency virus (HIV) is a virus that targets the CD4 cells (a type of white blood cell) within the body's immune system and causes HIV disease or HIV/AIDS. CD4 counts within a non-affected immune system would range anywhere from 500-1500 cells per cubic millimeter of blood, while an affected immune system would show cell counts below 200. HIV infection can lead to progressively worsening immunodeficiency, a condition ideal for the development of opportunistic infection. As HIV worsens over time, the term AIDS, or acquired immunodeficiency syndrome has been used to describe the condition and extensive damage to the immune system as well as the onset and susceptibility to other illnesses. The onset of AIDS leads to respiratory and central nervous system opportunistic infections, including but not limited to pneumonia, tuberculosis and meningitis. Kaposi's sarcoma, a virally associated cancer, and non-Hodgkin's lymphoma are two types of cancers that are generally defined as AIDS malignancies. As immune function declines and HIV-infection progresses to AIDS, individuals are at an increased risk of opportunistic infections that their immune systems are no longer capable of responding properly to. Because of this, opportunistic infections are a leading cause of HIV/AIDS-related deaths.

== Causes ==
Immunodeficiency is characterized by the absence of or the disruption in components of the immune system such as white blood cells (e.g. lymphocytes, phagocytes, etc.). These disruptions cause a decrease in immune function and result in an overall reduction of immunity against pathogens.

They can be caused by a variety of factors, including:

- Pre-existing conditions such as
  - HIV/AIDS infection
  - Systemic Lupus Erythematosus (SLE)
  - Rheumatoid arthritis
  - Multiple Sclerosis and the treatments associated with it
- Other causes include:
  - Undergoing organ transplant with the use of immunosuppressant agents
  - Receiving chemotherapy and other immunosuppressant drugs to combat cancer
  - Malnutrition
  - Genetic predisposition
  - Skin damage- cuts, burns, etc.
  - Antibiotic treatment or the misuse of antibiotics leading to disruption of the normal microbiome, thus allowing some microorganisms to outcompete others and become pathogenic (e.g. disruption of intestinal microbiota may lead to Clostridium difficile infection)
  - Medical procedures such as surgeries, endoscopies, implants, and catheterization
  - Pregnancy due to increase susceptibility and hormonal changes
  - Aging
  - Leukopenia (i.e. neutropenia and lymphocytopenia)
  - The lack of or the disruption of normal vaginal microbiota

== Prevention ==
Since opportunistic infections can cause severe disease, much emphasis is placed on measures to prevent infection. Such a strategy usually includes restoration of the immune system as soon as possible, avoiding exposures to infectious agents, and using antimicrobial medications ("prophylactic medications") directed against specific infections.

=== Restoration of immune system ===
- In patients with HIV, starting antiretroviral therapy is recommended for restoration of the immune system and reducing the incidence rate of opportunistic infections
- In patients undergoing chemotherapy, completion of, and recovery from treatment is the primary method for immune system restoration and to prevent infection occurrence. In a select subset of high-risk patients, granulocyte colony stimulating factors (G-CSF) can be used to aid immune system recovery and infection prevention.

=== Avoidance of infectious exposure ===
- Ensure poultry is cooked to 165 °F (74 °C). Beef and pork cuts should reach an internal temperature of 145 °F (63 °C). Ground meat should be cooked to 160 °F (71 °C). Ensure juice, and dairy products are labeled as pasteurized. Eggs should be cooked until both yolks and whites are firm.
- Avoid oral exposure to feces.
- Ensure proper steps such as regular handwashing, and use of PPE are followed for the care of farm animals who are sick, specifically those experiencing diarrhea.
- Ensure proper handling and handwashing with cat feces (e.g. cat litter): source of Toxoplasma gondii, Bartonella spp.
- Avoid soil/dust in areas where there is known Histoplasma capsulatum present. If it cannot be avoided in an environment, ensure PPE is being used.
- Ensure reptiles and amphibians, their live food, and their waste are being handled properly and wash hands regularly after handling to prevent transmission of pathogens such as Salmonella.
- Avoid unprotected sexual intercourse with individuals that have sexually transmitted infections.

=== Prophylactic medications ===
Individuals at higher risk for opportunistic infections are often prescribed prophylactic medication to prevent an infection from occurring. A person's risk level for developing an opportunistic infection is approximated using the person's CD4 T-cell count and other indicators such as current medical treatments, age, and lifestyle choices. The table below provides information regarding the treatment management of common opportunistic infections.

Opportunistic infections	Indication(s) for prophylactic medications	Preferred agent(s)	When to discontinue agent(s)	Secondary prophylactic/maintenance agent(s)
Mycobacterium tuberculosis	Upon diagnosis of HIV, any positive screening test, or prior medical history of Mycobacterium tuberculosis.	Rifampicin; Isoniazid; Pyridoxine; Pyrazinamide; Ethambutol	These current agents' doses/frequency will discontinue after two months. Depending on clinical presentation, maintenance agents will continue for at least four more months.	Rifampicin, isoniazid, and pyridoxine
Pneumocystis jiroveci	CD4 count is less than 200 cells/mm^{3} or less than 14%. The person has documented medical history of recurrent oropharyngeal candidiasis.	Trimethoprim-sulfamethoxazole	This current agent doses/frequency will discontinue after 21 days. Secondary prophylactic agent dose/frequency will continue until the CD4 count is above 200 cells/mm^{3} and the HIV viral load is undetectable for at least three months while taking antiretroviral therapy.	Trimethoprim-sulfamethoxazole
Toxoplasma gondii	CD4 count is less than 100 cells/mm^{3} or less than 14%, and the person has a positive serology for Toxoplasma gondii.	Trimethoprim-sulfamethoxazole	This agent will discontinue after six weeks. Secondary prophylactic medications will continue until the CD4 count is above 200 cells/mm^{3} and HIV viral load is undetectable for at least six months while taking antiretroviral therapy.	Sulfadiazine, pyrimethamine, and folinic acid
Mycobacterium avium complex disease	CD4 count is less than 50 cells/mm^{3} and has a detectable viral load while taking antiretroviral therapy.	Clarithromycin and ethambutol; Rifabutin may be added depending on clinical presentation.	These agent(s) will discontinue after 12 months only if the person does not have any symptoms that will be concerning for persistent Mycobacterium avium complex disease and their CD4 count is above 100 cells/mm^{3}, and while their HIV viral load is undetectable for at least six months while taking antiretroviral therapy.	N/A

=== Alternative prevention ===
Alternative agents can be used instead of the preferred agents. These alternative agents may be used due to an individual's allergies, availability, or clinical presentation. The alternative agents are listed in the table below.

Opportunistic infections	Alternative agent(s)
Mycobacterium tuberculosis	Rifabutin
Pneumocystis jiroveci	Dapsone; Atovaquone; Pentamidine
Toxoplasma gondii	Dapsone, pyrimethamine, and folinic acid; Atovaquone, pyrimethamine, and folinic acid
Mycobacterium avium complex disease	Azithromycin and ethambutol

== Treatment ==
Due to the prevention techniques used with HIV patients, such as prophylactic medications, opportunistic infections in HIV patients have decreased in number over the past few decades. In some circumstances, where individuals are not aware they have HIV and they develop an opportunistic infection, they may be prescribed antivirals, antibiotics, or antifungals. After the infection has cleared, and to prevent it from coming back, they may be recommended to stay on that medication as well as it being coupled with another medication to ensure drug efficiency.
