= Mycobacterium haemophilum =

Scientific classification
- Domain: Bacteria
- Kingdom: Bacillati
- Phylum: Actinomycetota
- Class: Actinomycetes
- Order: Mycobacteriales
- Family: Mycobacteriaceae
- Genus: Mycobacterium
- Species: M. haemophilum

Binomial name
- Mycobacterium haemophilum Sompolinsky et al. 1978, ATCC 29548

Species of bacterium

Mycobacterium haemophilum is a Gram-positive, acid-fast bacterium in the phylum Actinomycetota. It was first isolated in 1978 from a subcutaneous lesion in a Hodgkin’s disease patient.

The species name, haemophilum, means "blood loving" and refers to the bacterium's unique iron requirement for growth.

It is frequently found in the environment, although its exact habitat remains unknown, where it can colonize and potentially infect humans and animals.

== Microbiology ==
M. haemophilum are short, occasionally curved, gram-positive, nonmotile, and strongly acid-fast rods that are 1.2 μm to 2.5 μm in length. They have nonpigmented and rough to smooth colonies that can take up to 8 weeks to exhibit visible growth. Like M. tuberculosis, M. haemophilum has the ability to exhibit strings, proving that cord formation should no longer be attributed exclusively to M. tuberculosis.

M. haemophilum is unique among mycobacteria in its requirement for hemin or ferric ammonium citrate for growth, as well as for favoring the lower growth temperatures of 25–35°C. The pathogenicity of M. haemophium appears to be temperature dependent, consistent with the fact that most infections occur on the skin and other sites with lower body temperature.

Mycobacterium leprae and M. haemophilum have similar abundances of the fatty acid docosanoic acid, and M. haemophilum contains a phenolic glycolipid antigen that closely resembles the corresponding lipid in M. leprae. Additionally, M. leprae has major membrane protein I, which is absent in the M. tuberculosis complex, but is present in M. haemophilum, as well as M. avium and M. smegmatis.

Optimal detection of M. haemophilum involves acid-fast staining, culturing at two temperatures with iron-containing media, and molecular detection. Failure to isolate a pathogen in clinical samples with positive acid-fast stains under typical conditions should raise suspicion for M. haemophilum infection and appropriate growing conditions or molecular detection should be utilized.

== Clinical Relavance ==
M. haemophilum primarily infects immunocompromised patients, and approximately 50% of infections have been in paitents with AIDS. However, there have been reports of infections in immunocompetent pediatric patients with localized cervical lymphadenopathy.

In contrast to M. tuberculosis infections, M. haemophilum is not a reportable infection, thus, the true number of cases may be higher than indicated by case reports.

The classical clinical presentation includes multiple skin nodules occurring in clusters or without definitive pattern, commonly involving the extremities. The skin lesions usually evolve from papules to asymptomatic pustules to very painful deep-seated ulcers. Abscesses, draining fistulas, and osteomyelitis may be associated with the nodules. Occasionally, disseminated and pulmonary infections can occur.

Cutaneous and articular manifestations of M. haemophilum infection have a more favorable prognosis than infections with pulmonary involvement.

M. haemophilum infection is not limited to humans; infections have also been reported in fish, snakes, and bison.

There are no standard guidelines for treatment of M. haemophilum, however, it is suggested that patients be treated with multiple antibiotics, with the antibiotic choice relying on the degree of immunosuppression and disease presentation. A combination of clarithromycin, ciprofloxacin, and a rifamycin for 12 to 24 months is particularly promising. Overall, M. haemophilum appears to be susceptible to ciprofloxacin, clarithromycin, rifabutin, and clofazimine. Isoniazid and ethambutol resistance has been noted. A disk agar elution method for M. haemophilum has been proposed by CLSI.

== Type strain ==
M. haemophilum was first isolated in Israel from a subcutaneous granuloma from a patient with Hodgkin's disease. An environmental reservoir is presumed. Strain ATCC 29548 = CCUG 47452 = CIP 105049 = DSM 44634 = NCTC 11185.
