= Crohns MAP Vaccine =

Viral vector vaccine

The Crohns MAP Vaccine is an experimental Viral vector vaccine intended to prevent or treat Crohn's disease by provoking an immune response to one possible causative agent of the disease, Mycobacterium avium subsp. paratuberculosis. As of 2021, the vaccine was about to begin Phase 2 of its development. One of the scientists involved in this research is Thomas Borody, known for his work in developing the Triple Therapy for treating ulcers caused by Helicobacter pylori.
