= Mycobacterium avium subsp. paratuberculosis =

Scientific classification
- Domain: Bacteria
- Kingdom: Bacillati
- Phylum: Actinomycetota
- Class: Actinomycetes
- Order: Mycobacteriales
- Family: Mycobacteriaceae
- Genus: Mycobacterium
- Subgenus: Mycobacterium avium complex
- Species: M. avium
- Subspecies: M. a. subsp. paratuberculosis

Trinomial name
- Mycobacterium avium subsp. paratuberculosis (Bergey et al. 1923) Thorel et al. 1990

Subspecies of bacteria

Mycobacterium avium subspecies paratuberculosis (MAP) is an obligate pathogenic bacterium in the genus Mycobacterium. It is often abbreviated M. paratuberculosis or M. avium ssp. paratuberculosis. It is the causative agent of Johne's disease, which affects ruminants such as cattle, and suspected causative agent in human Crohn's disease and rheumatoid arthritis. The type strain is ATCC 19698 (equivalent to CIP 103963 or DSM 44133).

== Pathophysiology ==
MAP causes Johne's disease in cattle and other ruminants. It has long been suspected as a causative agent in Crohn's disease in humans, but studies have been unable to show definite correlation. One study has argued that the presence of antibodies against Mycobacterium avium subspecies paratuberculosis is associated with increased propensity of patients with Crohn's disease to receive biological therapy.

Recent studies have shown that MAP present in milk can survive pasteurization, which has raised human health concerns due to the widespread nature of MAP in modern dairy herds. MAP survival during pasteurization is dependent on the D_{72C}-value of the strains present and their concentration in milk. It is heat resistant and is capable of sequestering itself inside white blood cells, which may contribute to its persistence in milk. It has also been reported to survive chlorination in municipal water supplies.

MAP is a slow growing organism and is difficult to culture. Bacterial cultures were regarded as Gold standards for detection of MAP. Detection is very limited in fresh tissues, food, and water. Recently, John Aitken and Otakaro Pathways have discovered a method to culture MAP from human blood. Testing is ongoing. Professor John Hermon-Taylor of King's College London is developing a new vector type anti MAP vaccine which he claims is both curative and preventative. Stage 1 human trials began in January 2017 and concluded successfully in September 2019. He is also developing a companion MAP blood test.

It is not susceptible to antituberculosis drugs (which can generally kill Mycobacterium tuberculosis). MAP is susceptible to antibiotics used to treat Mycobacterium avium disease, such as rifabutin and clarithromycin, however the capacity of these antibiotics to eradicate MAP infection in vivo has not been established.

=== Crohn's disease ===
MAP is recognized as a multi-host mycobacterial pathogen with a proven specific ability to initiate and maintain systemic infection and chronic inflammation of the intestine of a range of histopathological types in many animal species, including primates.

MAP has been found in larger numbers within the intestines of Crohn's disease patients and in significant amount of irritable bowel syndrome patients compared to those with ulcerative colitis or otherwise healthy controls. One study concluded that MAP "may act as a causative agent, have a role in the context of secondary infection, which may exacerbate the disease, or represent non-pathogenic colonisation." The Crohns MAP Vaccine is an experimental vaccine based on this hypothesis.

== Genome ==
The genome of MAP strain K-10 was sequenced in 2005 and found to consist of a single circular chromosome of 4,829,781 base pairs, and to encode 4,350 predicted ORFs, 45 tRNAs, and one rRNA operon.

== See also ==
- Zoonosis
