= Clarithromycin =

Antibiotic medication

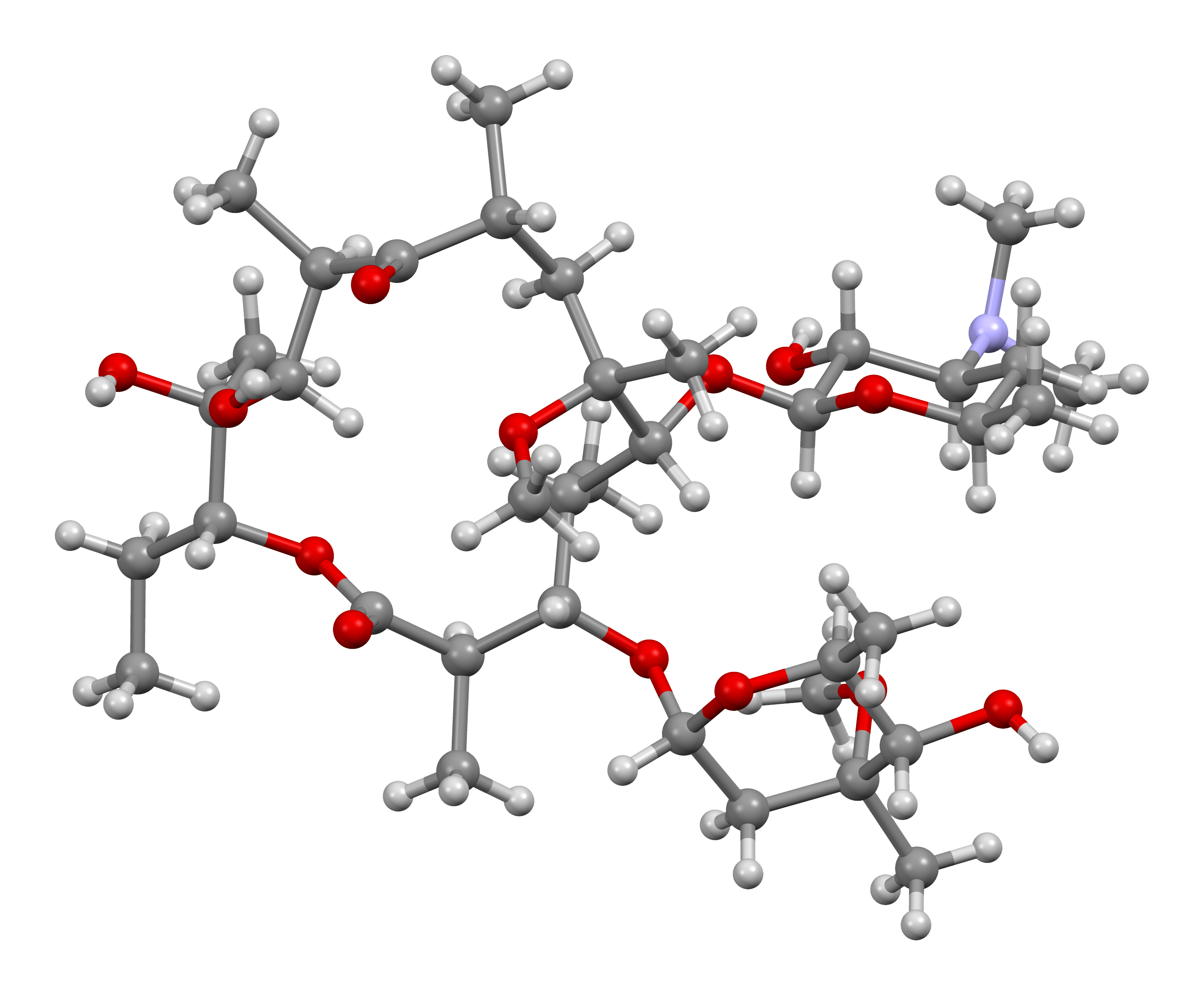

Clinical data
- Trade names: Biaxin, Klav, etc.
- Other names: 6-O-Methylerythromycin A
- AHFS/Drugs.com: Monograph
- MedlinePlus: a692005
- License data: US DailyMed: Clarithromycin
- Pregnancy category: AU: B3
- Routes of administration: By mouth
- Drug class: Macrolides
- ATC code: J01FA09 (WHO)

Legal status
- Legal status: AU: S4 (Prescription only); CA: ℞-only; US: ℞-only; EU: Rx-only; In general: ℞ (Prescription only)

Pharmacokinetic data
- Bioavailability: 50%
- Protein binding: Low binding
- Metabolism: Liver
- Elimination half-life: 3–4 h

Identifiers
- IUPAC name: (3R,4S,5S,6R,7R,9R,11S,12R,13S,14R)-6-{[(2S,3R,4S,6R) -4-(dimethylamino)-3-hydroxy-6-methyloxan-2-yl]oxy} -14-ethyl-12,13-dihydroxy-4-{[(2R,4R,5S,6S)-5-hydroxy -4-methoxy-4,6-dimethyloxan-2-yl]oxy}-7 -methoxy-3,5,7,9,11,13-hexamethyl -1-oxacyclotetradecane-2,10-dione
- CAS Number: 81103-11-9
- PubChem CID: 84029
- DrugBank: DB01211
- ChemSpider: 10342604
- UNII: H1250JIK0A
- KEGG: D00276
- ChEMBL: ChEMBL1741
- CompTox Dashboard (EPA): DTXSID3022829
- ECHA InfoCard: 100.119.644

Chemical and physical data
- Formula: C_{38}H_{69}NO_{13}
- Molar mass: 747.964 g·mol^{−1}
- 3D model (JSmol): Interactive image
- SMILES: CC[C@@H]1[C@@]([C@@H]([C@H](C(=O)[C@@H](C[C@@]([C@@H]([C@H]([C@@H]([C@H](C(=O)O1)C)O[C@H]2C[C@@]([C@H]([C@@H](O2)C)O)(C)OC)C)O[C@H]3[C@@H]([C@H](C[C@H](O3)C)N(C)C)O)(C)OC)C)C)O)(C)O
- InChI: InChI=1S/C38H69NO13/c1-15-26-38(10,45)31(42)21(4)28(40)19(2)17-37(9,47-14)33(52-35-29(41)25(39(11)12)16-20(3)48-35)22(5)30(23(6)34(44)50-26)51-27-18-36(8,46-13)32(43)24(7)49-27/h19-27,29-33,35,41-43,45H,15-18H2,1-14H3/t19-,20-,21+,22+,23-,24+,25+,26-,27+,29-,30+,31-,32+,33-,35+,36-,37-,38-/m1/s1; Key:AGOYDEPGAOXOCK-KCBOHYOISA-N

Clarithromycin, sold under the brand name Biaxin among others, is an antibiotic used to treat various bacterial infections. This includes strep throat, pneumonia, skin infections, H. pylori infection, and Lyme disease. Clarithromycin is only available as an oral preparation.

Common side effects include nausea, vomiting, headaches, and diarrhea. Severe allergic reactions are rare. Liver problems have been reported. It may cause harm if taken during pregnancy. It is in the macrolide class and works by slowing down bacterial protein synthesis. Clarithromycin resistance is already a major challenge to healthcare systems and such resistance is spreading, leading to recommendations to test the susceptibility of pathogenic organisms to the antibiotic before commencing clarithromycin therapy.

Clarithromycin was developed in 1980 and approved for medical use in 1990. It is on the World Health Organization's List of Essential Medicines. Clarithromycin is available as a generic medication. It is made from erythromycin and is chemically known as 6-O-methylerythromycin.

== Medical uses ==
=== Antibiotic ===
Clarithromycin is primarily used to treat a number of bacterial infections including pneumonia, Helicobacter pylori, and as an alternative to penicillin in strep throat. Other uses include cat scratch disease and other infections due to Bartonella, cryptosporidiosis, as a second line agent in Lyme disease and toxoplasmosis. It may also be used to prevent bacterial endocarditis in those who cannot take penicillin. It is effective against upper and lower respiratory tract infections, skin and soft tissue infections and helicobacter pylori infections associated with duodenal ulcers.

==== Spectrum of bacterial susceptibility ====
Aerobic Gram-positive bacteria

- Staphylococcus aureus
- Streptococcus pneumoniae
- Streptococcus pyogenes

Aerobic Gram-negative bacteria

- Haemophilus parainfluenzae
- Haemophilus influenzae
- Moraxella catarrhalis

Helicobacter

- Helicobacter pylori

Mycobacteria

Mycobacterium avium complex consisting of:

- Mycobacterium avium
- Mycobacterium intracellulare

Other bacteria

- Chlamydia pneumoniae
- Mycoplasma pneumoniae

Safety and effectiveness of clarithromycin in treating clinical infections due to the following bacteria have not been established in adequate and well-controlled clinical trials:

Aerobic Gram-positive bacteria

- Streptococcus agalactiae
- Streptococcus (Groups C, F, G)
- Viridans group streptococci

Aerobic Gram-negative bacteria

- Bordetella pertussis
- Legionella pneumophila
- Pasteurella multocida

Anaerobic Gram-positive bacteria

- Clostridium perfringens
- Peptococcus niger
- Cutibacterium acnes

Anaerobic Gram-negative bacteria

- Prevotella melaninogenica (formerly Bacteroides melaninogenicus)

=== Idiopathic hypersomnia ===
Clarithromycin has been researched as a potential treatment for idiopathic hypersomnia (IH) in adults, but the evidence is limited. A 2021 Cochrane study determined that the evidence is inadequate to definitively determine the efficacy of clarithromycin in the management of idiopathic hypersomnia. The American Academy of Sleep Medicine's 2021 clinical practice guidelines conditionally suggested its use, especially for those who don't respond to other therapies.

== Contraindications ==
- Clarithromycin should not be taken by people who are allergic to other macrolides or inactive ingredients in the tablets, including microcrystalline cellulose, sodium croscarmellose, magnesium stearate, and povidone
- Clarithromycin should not be used by people with a history of cholestatic jaundice and/or liver dysfunction associated with prior clarithromycin use.
- Clarithromycin should not be used in the setting of hypokalaemia (low blood potassium)
- Use of clarithromycin with the following medications: cisapride, pimozide, astemizole, terfenadine, ergotamine, ticagrelor, ranolazine or dihydroergotamine is not recommended.
- It should not be used with colchicine in people with kidney or liver impairment.
- Concomitant use with cholesterol medications such as lovastatin or simvastatin.
- Hypersensitivity to clarithromycin or any component of the product, erythromycin, or any macrolide antibiotics.
- QT prolongation or ventricular cardiac arrhythmias, including torsade de pointes.

== Side effects ==
The most common side effects are gastrointestinal: diarrhea (3%), nausea (3%), abdominal pain (3%), and vomiting (6%). It also can cause headaches, insomnia, and abnormal liver function tests. Allergic reactions include rashes and anaphylaxis. Less common side effects (<1%) include extreme irritability, hallucinations (auditory and visual), dizziness/motion sickness, and alteration in senses of smell and taste, including a metallic taste. Dry mouth, panic attacks, and nightmares have also been reported, albeit less frequently.

=== Cardiac ===
In February 2018, the US Food and Drug Administration (FDA) issued a safety communication warning with respect to an increased risk for heart problems or death with the use of clarithromycin, and has recommended that alternative antibiotics be considered in those with heart disease.

Clarithromycin can lead to a prolonged QT interval. In patients with long QT syndrome, cardiac disease, or patients taking other QT-prolonging medications, this can increase risk for life-threatening arrhythmias.

In one trial, the use of short-term clarithromycin treatment was correlated with an increased incidence of deaths classified as sudden cardiac deaths in stable coronary heart disease patients not using statins.

=== Liver and kidney ===
Clarithromycin has been known to cause jaundice, cirrhosis, and kidney problems, including kidney failure. Some case reports suspect it of causing liver disease.

=== Central nervous system ===
Common adverse effects of clarithromycin in the central nervous system include dizziness, headaches. Rarely, it can cause ototoxicity, delirium and mania.

=== Infection ===
A risk of oral candidiasis and vaginal candidiasis, due to the elimination of the yeast's natural bacterial competitors by the antibiotic, has also been noted.

=== Pregnancy and breastfeeding ===
Clarithromycin should not be used in pregnant women except in situations where no alternative therapy is appropriate. Clarithromycin can cause potential hazard to the fetus hence should be used during pregnancy only if the potential benefit justifies the potential risk to the fetus. For lactating mothers it is not known whether clarithromycin is excreted in human milk.

== Interactions ==
Clarithromycin inhibits a liver enzyme, CYP3A4, involved in the metabolism of many other commonly prescribed drugs. Taking clarithromycin with other medications that are metabolized by CYP3A4 may lead to unexpected increases or decreases in drug levels.

A few of the common interactions are listed below.

=== Colchicine ===
Clarithromycin has been observed to have a dangerous interaction with colchicine as the result of inhibition of CYP3A4 metabolism and P-glycoprotein transport. Combining these two drugs may lead to fatal colchicine toxicity, particularly in people with chronic kidney disease.

=== Statins ===
Taking clarithromycin concurrently with certain statins (a class of drugs used to reduce blood serum cholesterol levels) increases the risk of side effects, such as muscle aches and muscle break down (rhabdomyolysis).

=== Calcium channel blockers ===
Concurrent therapy with calcium channel blocker may increase risk of low blood pressure, kidney failure, and death, compared to pairing calcium channel blockers with azithromycin, a drug similar to clarithromycin but without CYP3A4 inhibition. Administration of clarithromycin in combination with verapamil have been observed to cause low blood pressure, low heart rate, and lactic acidosis.

=== Carbamazepine ===
Clarithromycin may double the level of carbamazepine in the body by reducing its clearance, which may lead to toxic symptoms of carbamazepine, such as double vision, loss of voluntary body movement, and nausea, as well as hyponatremia.

=== HIV medications ===
Depending on the combination of medications, clarithromycin therapy could be contraindicated, require changing doses of some medications, or be acceptable without dose adjustments. For example, clarithromycin may lead to decreased zidovudine concentrations.

== Pharmacology ==
=== Mechanism of action ===
Clarithromycin prevents bacteria from multiplying by acting as a protein synthesis inhibitor. It binds to 23S rRNA, a component of the 50S subunit of the bacterial ribosome, thus inhibiting the translation of peptides.

In addition to its antibiotic activity, clarithromycin has been found to act as a negative allosteric modulator of the GABA_{A} receptor. In relation to this action, it may have wakefulness-promoting effects in people with hypersomnia.

=== Pharmacokinetics ===
Unlike erythromycin, clarithromycin is acid-stable, so can be taken orally without having to be protected from gastric acids. It is readily absorbed, and diffuses into most tissues and phagocytes. Due to the high concentration in phagocytes, clarithromycin is actively transported to the site of infection. During active phagocytosis, large concentrations of clarithromycin are released; its concentration in the tissues can be over 10 times higher than in plasma. Highest concentrations are found in liver, lung tissue, and stool.

==== Metabolism ====
Clarithromycin has a fairly rapid first-pass metabolism in the liver. Its major metabolites include an inactive metabolite, N-desmethylclarithromycin, and an active metabolite, 14-(R)-hydroxyclarithromycin. Compared to clarithromycin, 14-(R)-hydroxyclarithromycin is less potent against mycobacterial tuberculosis and the Mycobacterium avium complex. Clarithromycin (20%-40%) and its active metabolite (10%-15%) are excreted in urine. Of all the drugs in its class, clarithromycin has the best bioavailability at 50%, which makes it amenable to oral administration. Its elimination half-life is about 3 to 4 hours with 250 mg administered every 12 h, but increased to 5 to 7 h with 500 mg administered every 8 to 12 h. With any of these dosing regimens, the steady-state concentration of this metabolite is generally attained within 3 to 4 days.

== History ==
Clarithromycin was invented by researchers at the Japanese drug company Taisho Pharmaceutical in 1980. The product emerged through efforts to develop a version of the antibiotic erythromycin that did not experience acid instability in the digestive tract, causing side effects, such as nausea and stomach ache. Taisho filed for patent protection for the drug around 1980 and subsequently introduced a branded version of its drug, called Clarith, to the Japanese market in 1991. In 1985, Taisho partnered with the American company Abbott Laboratories for the international rights, and Abbott also gained FDA approval for Biaxin in October 1991. The drug went generic in Europe in 2004 and in the US in mid-2005.

== Society and culture ==
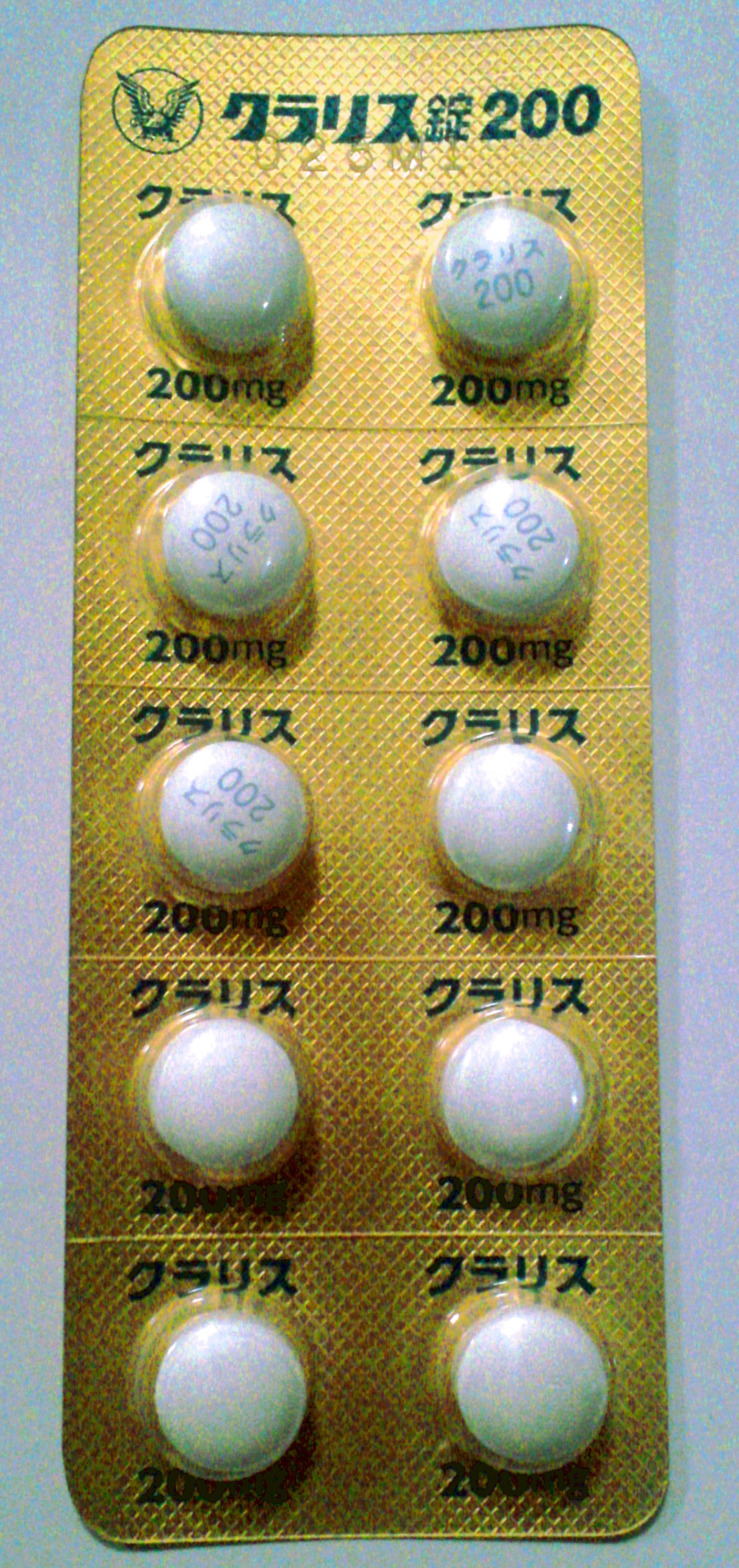
A pack of clarithromycin tablets manufactured by Taisho Pharmaceutical

=== Available forms ===
Clarithromycin is available as a generic medication. In the United States, clarithromycin is available as immediate-release tablets, extended-release tablets, and granules for oral suspension.

=== Brand names ===
Clarithromycin is available under several brand names in many different countries, including Biaxin, Crixan, Claritron, Clarihexal, Clacid, Claritt, Clacee, Clarac, Clariwin, Claripen, Clarem, Claridar, Cloff, Fromilid, Infex, Kalixocin, Karicin, Klaricid, Klaridex, Klacid, Klaram, Klabax, Klerimed, MegaKlar, Monoclar, Resclar, Rithmo, Truclar, Vikrol and Zeclar.

=== Manufacturers ===
In the UK the drug product is manufactured in generic form by a number of manufacturers including Somex Pharma, Brown & Burk UK Ltd., Ranbaxy, Aptil and Sandoz.

== Research ==
=== Hypersomnolence ===
Clarithromycin has been studied in a phase 2 clinical trial in the treatment of central hypersomnolence (i.e., idiopathic hypersomnolence and narcolepsy without cataplexy). There was no apparent improvement on an objective measure of vigilance, but subjective sleepiness was reduced with the drug compared to placebo. It is thought to work for this use as a GABA_{A} receptor negative allosteric modulator.
