= Heinrich Albert Johne =

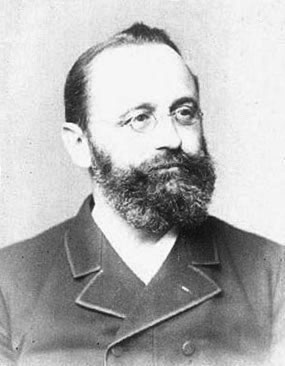

(Heinrich) Albert Johne (10 December 1839 – 5 December 1910) (pronounced YOH-ne) was a pathologist born in Dresden, Kingdom of Saxony. He contributed to the literature of actinomycosis and trichinosis and discovered a method of staining bacterial capsules.

He studied in Dresden. 1879 he became professor for Pathology at Veterinary School in Dresden (Tierärztliche Hochschule Dresden).

He was instrumental in the introduction of meat inspection.

Johne's disease, a paratuberculosis disease of cattle he described in 1895, is named for him.

== Sources ==
- Who's Who in Science (Marquis Who's Who Inc, Chicago Ill. 1968) ISBN 0-8379-1001-3
