= Mycobacterium avium subsp. hominissuis =

Scientific classification
- Domain: Bacteria
- Phylum: Actinomycetota
- Class: Actinomycetes
- Order: Mycobacteriales
- Family: Mycobacteriaceae
- Genus: Mycobacterium
- Species: M. avium
- Subspecies: "M. a. subsp. hominissuis"

Trinomial name
- "Mycobacterium avium subsp. hominissuis" none, suggested by Mijs et al. 2002

Subspecies of bacterium

"Mycobacterium avium subsp. hominissuis" belongs to the genus Mycobacterium of the phylum Actinomycetota. Actinobacteria are characterized by a gram-positive cell wall with a high guanine and cytosine content. Although M. avium is gram-positive, it shares features with gram-negative bacteria such as an "outer permeability barrier acting as a pseudo-outer membrane."

Mycobacterium avium subsp. hominissuis is a subspecies of the genus Mycobacterium thus its cell wall composition includes mycolic acids. Importantly, the mycolyl-arabinogalactan-peptidogylcan (mAGP) complex of the cell wall is composed of these aforementioned mycolic acids. This specific composition leads to increased virulence and infection rates.

Mycobacterium avium is found in the environment: soil, water, dust, etc. and is typically spread via ingestion. There is additional speculation that it's transmitted from human to human. This phenomenon has been observed in hospitals with cystic fibrosis patients.

== Non-Tuberculosis Mycobacteria (NTM) ==
Mycobacterium avium subsp. hominissuis is a non-tuberculosis Mycobacteria (NTM). Like other Mycobacteria, NTMs are opportunistic pathogens - they cause illness in people with suppressed immune systems more than they infect people with healthy immune systems. A well-known species of Mycobacterium is M. Tuberculosis which is responsible for tuberculosis (TB) infections. In 2023, TB globally caused illness in 10.8 million people and the subsequent deaths of 1.25 million people.

While in the same genus as M. tuberculosis, M. avium isn't considered a tuberculosis bacterium. But, as an NTM it does cause infection. Specifically, M. avium takes advantage of diseased and weakened lung tissue as found in conditions like cystic fibrosis (CF). Once in the immune system, M. avium can cause pulmonary (lung) infections. This phenomenon can be seen in the infection rates of those with chronic lung diseases like CF. In 2023, 10% of CF patients in the U.S. tested positive for a NTM infection.

== Taxon designation ==
Based on differences in IS1245 RFLP, 16S-23S rDNA ITS and growth temperature, Mijs et al. 2002. propose to reserve the designation of Mycobacterium avium subsp. avium for bird-type isolates.

These authors suggest, but don't formally propose, that the designation of Mycobacterium avium subsp. hominissuis be strictly for isolates originating from humans and pigs. The suggested name for Mycobacterium avium subsp. hominissuis reflects its origin of humans and pigs.
