= Mycobacterium avium subsp. silvaticum =

Scientific classification
- Domain: Bacteria
- Kingdom: Bacillati
- Phylum: Actinomycetota
- Class: Actinomycetes
- Order: Mycobacteriales
- Family: Mycobacteriaceae
- Genus: Mycobacterium
- Subgenus: Mycobacterium avium complex
- Species: M. avium
- Subspecies: M. a. subsp. silvaticum

Trinomial name
- Mycobacterium avium subsp. silvaticum Thorel et al. 1990

Subspecies of bacterium

Mycobacterium avium subsp. silvaticum is a species of the phylum Actinomycetota, belonging to the genus Mycobacterium.

Mycobacterium avium subsp. silvaticum Thorel et al. 1990 was previously known as Mycobacterium avium strain wood pigeon.
