= Nick Johne =

Canadian actor, comedian

- Born: Nicholas Paulson John; 1955 (age 69–70); Toronto, Ontario, Canada
- Occupations: Actor, comedian
- Years active: 1983–present

Nick Johne is a Canadian actor who is best known for playing Murray Woolworth's dimwitted assistant Dwayne Dortmund on the second season of The Red Green Show.

== Career ==
Nick majored in microbiology at the Ontario Agricultural College and began his improvisational career in Toronto, where free improv classes were being taught at the Harbourfront Centre. After failing out of microbiology and various forays in the theatrical world, Johne joined the Second City troupe in Toronto in 1991, where he performed in several award-winning shows.

== Personal life ==
Johne currently resides in Chicago, Illinois, where he teaches at the Chicago Second City training center and is a part time faculty member in the theatre department at DePaul University.

== Filmography ==
- The Republic of Love (2003)
- The Visual Bible: The Gospel of John (2003)
- The Pooch and the Pauper (2000)
- The Lady in Question (1999)
- Dog Park (1998)
- Hidden in America (1996)
- Ghost Mom (1993)
