= Mycobacterium avium complex =

Scientific classification
- Domain: Bacteria
- Phylum: Actinomycetota
- Class: Actinomycetes
- Order: Mycobacteriales
- Family: Mycobacteriaceae
- Genus: Mycobacterium
- Species complex: Mycobacterium avium complex

Binomial name
- Mycobacterium intracellulare Runyon 1965
- Mycobacterium avium Chester 1901 (Approved Lists 1980)

Group of bacteria

Mycobacterium avium complex is a group of mycobacteria comprising Mycobacterium intracellulare and Mycobacterium avium that are commonly grouped because they infect humans together; this group, in turn, is part of the group of nontuberculous mycobacteria. These bacteria cause Mycobacterium avium-intracellulare infections or Mycobacterium avium complex infections in humans. These bacteria are common and are found in fresh and salt water, in household dust and in soil. MAC bacteria usually cause infection in those who are immunocompromised or those with severe lung disease.

== Description ==
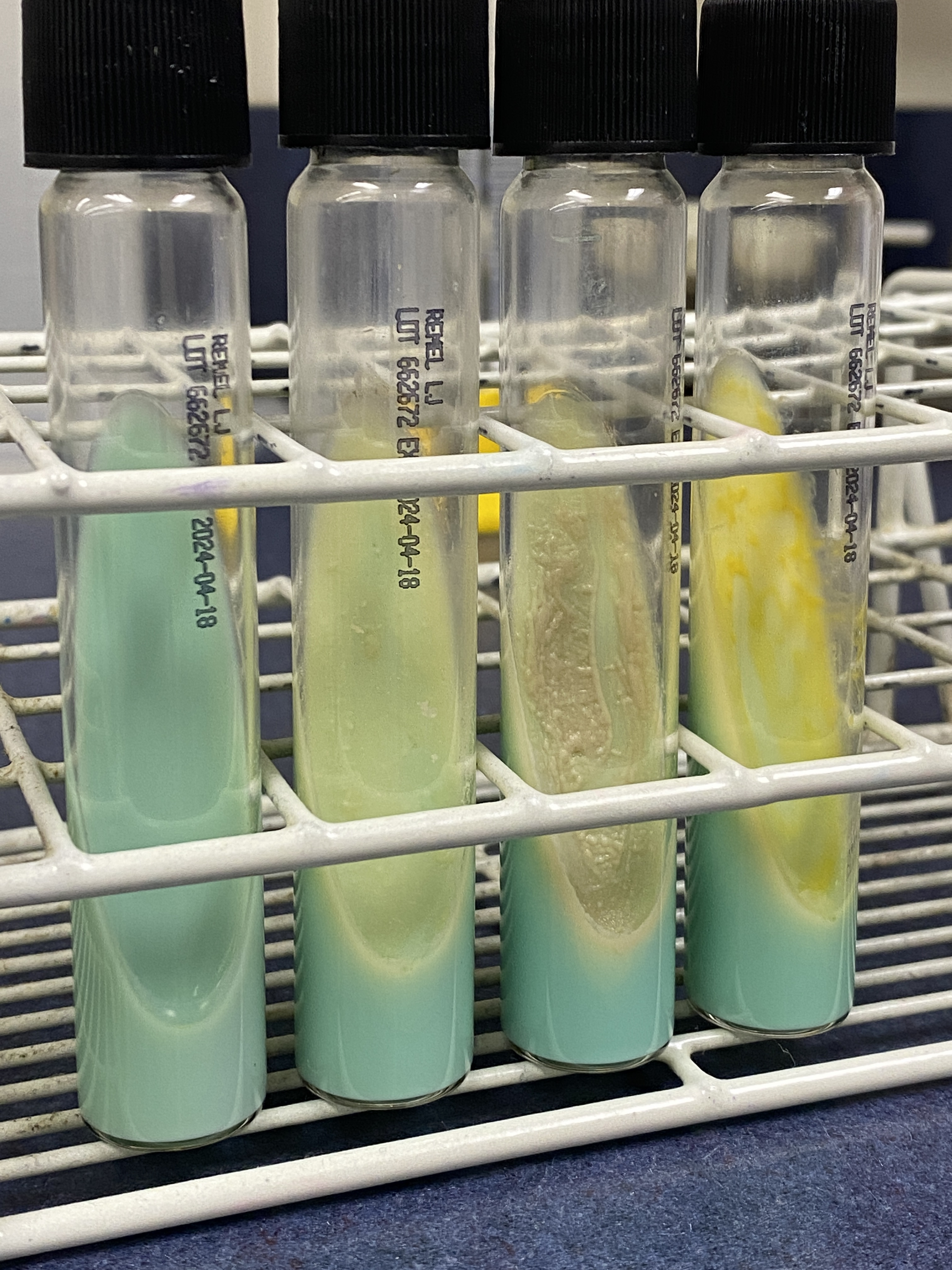
Slant tubes of Löwenstein-Jensen medium. From left to right: Negative control; M. tuberculosis: Dry-appearing colonies; Mycobacterium avium complex: Wet-appearing colonies; M. gordonae: Yellowish colonies

In the Runyon classification, both bacteria are nonchromogens. They can be differentiated from M. tuberculosis and each other by commercially available DNA probes.

They are characterized as Gram-positive, nonmotile, acid-fast, short to long rods.

Colony characteristics

- Usually, colonies are smooth, rarely rough, and not pigmented colonies. Older colonies may become yellow.

Physiology

- Growth on Löwenstein-Jensen medium and Middlebrook 7H10 agar occurs at 37 °C after seven or more days.
- The complex can be (but is not often) resistant to isoniazid, ethambutol, rifampin, and streptomycin.

Differential characteristics

- Mycobacterium intracellulare and M. avium form the M. avium complex (MAC).
- Remarkable ITS heterogeneity is seen within different M. intracellulare isolates.

== Species and subspecies ==
- Mycobacterium avium Chester 1901 (Approved Lists 1980)
  - Mycobacterium avium subsp. avium (Chester 1901) Thorel et al. 1990
  - "Mycobacterium avium subsp. hominissuis" Mijs et al. 2002
  - Mycobacterium avium subsp. paratuberculosis (Bergey et al. 1923) Thorel et al. 1990
  - Mycobacterium avium subsp. silvaticum Thorel et al. 1990
- Mycobacterium intracellulare corrig. (Cuttino and McCabe 1949) Runyon 1965 (Approved Lists 1980)
  - Mycobacterium intracellulare subsp. chimaera (Tortoli et al. 2004) Nouioui et al. 2018
  - Mycobacterium intracellulare subsp. intracellulare (Cuttino and McCabe 1949) Castejon et al. 2018

== Type strains ==
- Mycobacterium intracellulare type strains include ATCC 13950, CCUG 28005, CIP 104243, DSM 43223, JCM 6384, and NCTC 13025.
- Mycobacterium avium type strains include ATCC 25291, DSM 44156, and TMC 724.

== Human health ==
MAC bacteria enter most people's body when inhaled into the lungs or swallowed, but only cause infection in those who are immunocompromised or who have severe lung disease such as those with cystic fibrosis or chronic obstructive lung disease (COPD). MAC infection can cause COPD and lymphadenitis, and can cause disseminated disease, especially in people with immunodeficiency. During the last decade Mycobacterium chimaera (see below) infections following cardiothoracic surgery, especially open-heart surgery, have been increasingly reported worldwide. Infections usually involve the respiratory system. Mycobacterium chimaera is acquired during cardiopulmonary bypass via bioaerosols emitted from contaminated heater-cooler units water systems. Due to nonspecific symptoms and long latency, postoperative Mycobacterium chimaera infections may not be promptly diagnosed and treated, and may become life-threatening.

== History ==
In 2004, Tortoli et al. proposed the name M. chimaera for strains that a reverse hybridization–based line probe assay suggested belonged to MAIS (M. avium–M. intracellulare–M. scrofulaceum group), but were different from M. avium, M. intracellulare, or M. scrofulaceum. The new species name comes from the Chimera, a mythological being made up of parts of three different animals.

== See also ==
- Nontuberculous mycobacteria
