= Mycobacterium avium =

Scientific classification
- Domain: Bacteria
- Kingdom: Bacillati
- Phylum: Actinomycetota
- Class: Actinomycetes
- Order: Mycobacteriales
- Family: Mycobacteriaceae
- Genus: Mycobacterium
- Species: M. avium

Binomial name
- Mycobacterium avium Chester 1901 (Approved Lists 1980)

Type strain
- ATCC 25291; CCUG 20992; CIP 104244; DSM 44156; NCTC 13034

Subspecies
- Mycobacterium avium subsp. avium (Chester 1901) Thorel et al. 1990; "Mycobacterium avium subsp. hominissuis" Mijs et al. 2002; Mycobacterium avium subsp. paratuberculosis (Bergey et al. 1923) Thorel et al. 1990; Mycobacterium avium subsp. silvaticum Thorel et al. 1990

Species of bacterium

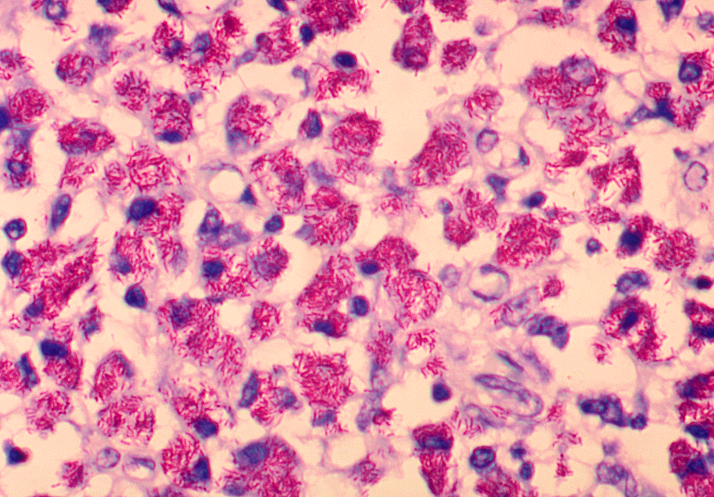

Mycobacterium avium is a species of Mycobacterium.

It is a member of the Mycobacterium avium complex.
